Even though game shows first evolved in the United States, they have been presented in many different countries around the world.

Argentina
100 Argentinos Dicen (Argentine version of Family Feud)
Buena Fortuna
Clink Caja
El Precio Justo (Argentine version of The Price Is Right)
¿Quien quiere ser millonario? (2001-2002,2019–present)
Sume y Lleve
Ta Te Show (Argentine version of Hollywood Squares) (1992–1996)
Trato Hecho (Argentine version of Deal or No Deal)
Boom! (Telefe 2017–present)
The Wall Construye tu vida (Telefe 2017–present)
Pasapalabra

Australia

As with most countries, Australia has made many adaptations of U.S. based game shows, most of which copy the U.S. version's set, particularly with the Grundy shows.

Belgium
De XII werken van Vanoudenhoven
Alles Moet Weg (Belgian version of Ant & Dec's Saturday Night Takeaway
Binnen De Minuut (Dutch-Belgian version of Minute to Win It)
Blind Date (Belgian version of The Dating Game)
Blokken (Tetris-based game show)
De Canvascrack
Donderen in Keulen
De Drie Wijzen
Familieraad (Belgian version of Family Feud)
Felice!
De generatieshow
De Grote Volksquiz
Go Go Stop
Hoger, Lager (Belgian version of Card Sharks)
De IQ Quiz
De Juiste Prijs (Dutch-Belgian version of The Price Is Right)
Le Juste Prix (French-Belgian version of The Price Is Right)
Kalmte Kan U Redden
Kan Iedereen Nog Volgen? (Show about the future)
De Pappenheimers
Qui sera millionnaire? (French-Belgian version of Who Wants to Be a Millionaire?)
Quix
Rap Klap (Dutch-Belgian version of Hot Streak / Ruck Zuck)
Rasters
De Slimste Mens ter Wereld
Sorry voor alles
Switch
Te nemen of te laten (Belgian version of Deal or No Deal
Twee tot de zesde macht
De val van 1 miljoen (Belgian version of The £100K Drop)
Vriend of Vijand
Walters Verjaardagsshow
We're Going to Ibiza
Weet Ik Veel
Wie wordt euromiljonair? (Dutch-Belgian version of Who Wants to Be a Millionaire?)
De Zwakste Schakel (Dutch-Belgian version of Weakest Link)

Brazil
Big Brother Brasil (Brazil's version of Big Brother) on Globo
	Clube dos Quinze (Brazil's version of Jackpot) on TV Globo and Tupi
Corrida de Formula B (Brazil's "original" version of Card Sharks) on Tupi
Ela Disse, Ele Disse (Brazil's version of Tattletales) on SBT
Familionária (Brazil's second version of Family Feud)
Family Feud (Brazil's version of Family Feud) on SBT
Identidade Secreta (Brazil's version of Identity) on SBT
Jogo das Familias (Brazil's "original" version of Family Feud) on Tupi and SBT
Jogo da Velha (Brazil's version of Hollywood Squares) on Globo
Jogo do Mais ou Menos (Brazil's "revival" of Card Sharks) on SBT
MegaSenha (Brazil's version of Million Dollar Password)
Namoro na TV (Brazil's version of The Dating Game) on Tupi and SBT
O Preço Certo (Brazil's version of The Price Is Right)
Olimpiadas do Faustao (Brazil's version of Takeshi's Castle on Globo)
Passa ou Repassa (Brazil's version of Double Dare) on SBT
Roleta Russa (Brazil's version of Russian Roulette) on Rede Record
Roletrando (now Roda a Roda) (Brazil's version of Wheel of Fortune) on SBT
Show do Milhão (Brazil's similar version of Who Wants to Be a Millionaire?) on SBT
SuperMarket (Brazil's version of Supermarket Sweep) on Band
Topa ou Não Topa (Brazil's version of Deal or No Deal) on SBT
Voce é mais esperto do que um aluno da quinta série? (Brazil's version of Are You Smarter Than a 5th Grader?) on SBT

Currently airing (2021/2022)

Globo
 Big Brother Brasil
 The Voice Brasil
 The Voice Kids
 Quem Quer Ser um Milionário? (Who Wants to Be a Millionaire?)
 Show dos Famosos (Your Face Sounds Familiar)
 Dança dos Famosos (Dancing with the Stars)
 Ding Dong (Superstar Ding Dong)
 Se vira nos 30 (30 Seconds to Fame)
 Super Chef Celebridades (Top Chef)
 Popstar
 The Wall
 SuperStar (Rising Star)
 Saltibum (Celebrity Splash!)
 Chefe Secreto (Undercover Boss)
 Dança no Gelo (Skating with Celebrities / Dancing on Ice)
 Agora ou Nunca
 Garotada & Cachorrada (reality show about children training dogs)
 Os Iluminados (Keep Your Light Shining)
 Truque Vip (reality show about magical tricks and illusionism with celebrities)
 The Ultimate Fighter: Brazil (The Ultimate Fighter)
 Tem gente atrás (Avanti un altro!)
 Jogo de Panelas (Come Dine with Me)
 Sufoco (The Whole 19 Yards)
 Hipertensão (Fear Factor)
 Maratoma (Wipeout)
 No Limite (Survivor)
 Jogo Duro (Estate of Panic)
 Super Chefinhos
 Super Chef
 De Cara no Muro (Brain Wall)
 Jogo dos 10 (Power of 10)
 Dancinha dos Famosos (Dancing with the Stars Kids)
 Circo do Faustão (Celebrity Circus)
 Soletrando
 Pulsação
 O Jogo (Murder in Small Town X)
 FAMA (Star Academy)
 Acorrentados (Chains of Love)
 Amor a Bordo
 Guerra dos Sonos (Exhausted)
 Video Game
 Jogo da Velha (Hollywood Squares)
 Ponto Fraco (The Weakest Link) (Canceled)
 Contender Series Brasil (The Contender) (future)
 Ninja Warrior Brasil (Ninja Warrior) (future)

Record
 A Fazenda (The Farm)
 Batalha dos Confeiteiros (Next Great Baker)
 Power Couple
 Dancing Brasil (Dancing with the Stars)
 A Casa (Get The F*ck Out Of My House)
 Canta Comigo (All Together Now)
 Isso Eu Faço
 Muro dos Famosos (Wall of Fame)
 Batalha dos Cozinheiros
 Got Talent Brasil (Got Talent)
 Me Leva Contigo (Taken Out)
 Topa um Acordo? (Let's Make a Deal)
 Além do Peso (Cuestión de peso)
 Ídolos Kids (Idols Kids)
 Amazônia
 Top Model, o Reality
 A Casa da Ana Hickmann
 Game Show
 O Preço Certo (The Price Is Right)
 Gugu bate em sua porta (Opportunity Knocks)
 Ídolos (Idols)
 Distração Fatal (Distraction)
 Troca de Família (Trading Spouses / Wife Swap)
 Brazil's Next Top Model
 O Jogador (PokerFace)
 O Aprendiz (The Apprentice)
 Extreme Makeover Social (Extreme Makeover)
 Simple Life: Mudando de Vida (The Simple Life)
 Sem Saída (Captive)
 Roleta Russa (Russian Roulette)
 Top TV
 Quarta Total
 O Vencedor (The Winner Is) (discontinuation in pursuing the project)
 A Caçada (The Chase) (uncertainty)
 O Cubo (The Cube) (uncertainty)
 Quem Está no Topo? (Who's on Top?) (uncertainty)
 (Iron Chef) (future?)

SBT
 Bake Off Brasil
 Júnior Bake Off Brasil
 Bake Off Brasil Celebrity
 BBQ Brasil (BBQ Champ)
 Hell's Kitchen: Cozinha sob Pressão
 Roda a Roda Jequiti (Wheel of Fortune)
 Programa Silvio Santos (Takeshi's Castle)
 Passa ou Repassa (Double Dare)
 Pra Ganhar É Só Rodar
 Fábrica de Casamentos
 Jogo das Fichas
 Nada além de Um Minuto (Minute to Win It)
 Rola ou Enrola?
 Fenômenos
 Esquadrão da Moda (What Not to Wear)
 Bomba! (Boom!)
 Cabelo Pantene - O Reality
 Qual é o Seu Talento? (What's Your Talent?)
 Caldeirão da Sorte
 Duelo de Mães
 Dance se Puder
 Máquina da Fama
 Esse Artista Sou Eu (Your Face Sounds Familiar)
 Festival Sertanejo
 Menino de Ouro (Football's Next Star)
 Famoso Quem? (My Name Is)
 Vamos Brincar de Forca
 Cante se Puder (Sing If You Can)
 Se Ela Dança, Eu Danço (So You Think You Can Dance)
 Esquadrão do Amor
 Um Milhão na Mesa (The Million Pound Drop)
 Cantando no SBT
 SOS Casamento
 Romance no Escuro (Dating in the Dark)
 Solitários (Solitary)
 Meu Pai é Melhor que Seu Pai (My Dad Is Better Than Your Dad)
 Topa ou Não Topa (Deal or No Deal)
 Um Contra Cem (1 vs. 100)
 Você Se Lembra? (Amne$ia)
 10 Anos Mais Jovem (10 Years Younger)
 Identidade Secreta (Identity)
 Só Falta Esposa
 Astros
 Supernanny
 Nada Além da Verdade (The Moment of Truth)
 Quem Manda É o Chefe
 High School Musical: A Seleção
 Tentação
 Você É mais Esperto que um Aluno da Quinta Série? (Are You Smarter than a 5th Grader?)
 Quem Perde, Ganha (The Biggest Loser)
 Vinte e Um (Twenty One)
 Namoro na TV (The Dating Game)
 Curtindo com Reais
 Curtindo com Crianças
 Você É o Jurado
 Ídolos (SBT) (Idols)
 Bailando por um Sonho
 Family Feud Brasil (Family Feud)
 Casamento à Moda Antiga
 O Grande Perdedor
 O Conquistador do Fim do Mundo
 Xaveco-Se Rolar...Rolou (Singled Out)
 Todos contra Um
 Popstars Brasil (Popstars)
 Ilha da Sedução (Temptation Island)
 Sete e Meio (Seven and a half)
 Curtindo uma Viagem
 Casa dos Artistas (Protagonistas)
 Audácia (Greed)
 Qual É a Música? (The Singing Bee)
 Qual é a Musica? (Name That Tune)
 Show do Milhão (Million Show)
 Gol Show
 Nações Unidas
 Cidade contra Cidade
 Casa dos Segredos (Secret Story) (future)
 Cinquenta (50–50) (uncertainty)

Band
 MasterChef Brasil
 MasterChef Júnior
 MasterChef Profissionais
 Pesadelo na Cozinha (Ramsay's Kitchen Nightmares)
 A Fuga (Raid the Cage)
 O Sócio (The Profit)
 Exathlon Brasil
 O Mundo Segundo os Brasileiros
 X Factor Brasil
 Shark Tank Brasil - Negociando com Tubarões (Shark Tank)
 Bate & Volta
 Sabe ou Não Sabe
 Quem Fica em Pé? (Who's Still Standing?)
 Mulheres Ricas (The Real Housewives)
 Perdidos na Tribo (Ticket To The Tribes)
 Projeto Fashion (Project Runway)
 The Phone – A Missão (The Phone)
 Busão do Brasil (The Bus)
 E24 (Medical reality show)
 Zero Bala
 É o Amor
 A Grande Chance (The Alphabet Game)
 Quem Pode mais? (Battle of the sexes game show)
 Cidade Nota 10 (City vs City)
 Joga Bonito
 Na Pressão
 Sobcontrole
 Território Livre
 Supermarket (Supermarket Sweep)

RedeTV!
 O Céu é o Limite (L'eredità)
 Mega Senha (Million Dollar Password)
 Conexão Models
 Operação de Risco
 Entubados
 Dr. Hollywood (Dr. 90210)
 Sob Medida
 The Bachelor Brasil (The Bachelor)
 Estação Teen
 Sexo a 3
 O Último Passageiro (The Last Passenger)
 Taxi do Milão (Cash Cab)
 Receita Pop (Ready Steady Cook)
 The Amazing Race: A Corrida Milionária (The Amazing Race)
 Clube das Mulheres
 GAS Sound
 Insomnia
 Apartamento das Modelos
 Interligado

TV Cultura
 Tá Certo?
 Quem Sabe, Sabe!
 Ecoprático
 É Proibido Colar

TV Aparecida
 Revelações
 Revelações Sertanejo
 Tudo em Família

Record News
 Car Motor Show
 Duelo de Salões
 X Smile Brasil

TV Escola
 SuperMerendeiras

EI BR
 Fanáticos Game Show

Shoptime
 Procura-se um Apresentador!
 O Grande Negócio (future)

Multishow
 Os Gretchens
 Só pra Parodiar
 Eisenbahn Mestre Cervejeiro
 Humoristinhas
 Casa Bonita
 Fábrica de Estrelas
 Minha Praia
 Geleia do Rock
 As Gostosas e os Geeks (Beauty and the Geek)
 Drag Race Brazil (RuPaul's Drag Race) (future)

Fox
 The Four Brasil (The Four)
 Corre e Costura

Nat Geo
 Os Incríveis – O Grande Desafio

GNT
 The Taste Brasil (The Taste)
 Por Um Fio (Shear Genius)

Sony
 Brazil's Next Top Model (Top Model)

Boomerang
 Saindo com minha Mãe
 Temporada de Moda Capricho

E!
 Drag me as a Queen
 Criador de Celebridades

MTV
 Are You the One? Brasil (Are You the One?)
 De Férias com o Ex Brasil (Ex on the Beach)
 Catfish Brasil (Catfish)
 Deu Match!
 Legends of Gaming Brasil
 Adotada
 Papito in Love
 Colírios Capricho
 Pimp My Ride Brasil (Pimp My Ride)
 Covernation

Bulgaria
Risk pecheli, risk gubi (game show, on BulgariaONE, previously on Efir 2/BNT 2 (1994–2000), bTV (2000–2005) and TV7 (2013))
10/64 (prime-time Q&A, on Kanal 1; cancelled)
Bum (Boom) (Q&A, on Evrokom)
Kosherut (The Hive) (game show, on Msat TV)
Minuta e mnogo (A Minute Is Too Much) (Q&A show with more difficult questions, on Kanal 1)
Sdelka ili ne (Deal or No Deal, literally "Deal or Not") (a version of the successful European game show, on Nova Television)
Stani bogat (Who Wants to Be a Millionaire?) (a version of the popular Q&A, on Nova Television and later on BNT 1 instead.)
Supershow Nevada (the first Bulgarian game show, created after the fall of socialism in the country)
Treska za zlato (Gold Fever) (lotto, on bTV (TV); cancelled)
Tova go znae vsyako hlape (Are You Smarter than a 5th Grader?)  (Q&A show with questions from school material from 1st to 5th grade, on bTV)
Vot na doverie (Vote of Confidence) (show that often features celebrities, on bTV (TV); cancelled)
Posledniyat Pecheli (The Last Wins) is a show with rounds and questionsof a theme and every theme has a different point prize. If the player wins, he continues to the next game until someone else beats him. The show airs on BNT 1.

Canada

Canadian English-language game and quiz shows have often been aimed towards children and teenagers between the ages of six and 19. A majority of these game shows often run for 30 minutes in each episode. They often derive their formats from game shows produced in the United States, most of them having been run on Canadian networks such as CTV, Global and Citytv.

Although American game and quiz shows are popular in Canada, Canadian residents are not eligible to be contestants on some of them, Wheel Of Fortune, Jeopardy! and The Price Is Right being three notable exceptions. Unlike in the US, game show winnings in Canada are not subject to income tax (actually, residents of most countries aside from the US are not subject to income tax on game show winnings).

There are very few Canadian adaptations of American, British, and Dutch-originated quiz shows in the English language. Most, like versions of The Price Is Right, Wheel of Fortune, Jeopardy!, and Family Feud, are in French. Some English-language versions of these shows include Supermarket Sweep, Who Wants to Be a Millionaire?, Deal or No Deal, Are You Smarter Than a 5th Grader?, and Cash Cab. There are also French-language versions of Deal or No Deal, Are You Smarter Than a 5th Grader?, and Cash Cab.

5-4-3-2-Run
Acting Crazy
Are You Smarter Than a Canadian 5th Grader?
Le Banquier
Brain Battle
Bumper Stumpers
Cash Cab
Le Cercle
Clips
Definition
Deal or No Deal Canada
Design to Win
Food For Thought
Front Page Challenge
Game On
La Guerre des clans
Guess What
Gutterball Alley
Headline Hunters
Inside the Box
It's Your Move
Jeux D'Enfants
Just Like Mom
Kidstreet
Lingo
Love Handles
Love Me, Love Me Not
The Joke's on Us
The Last Word
The Mad Dash
The Moneymakers
Les Mordus
Mr. and Mrs.
The New Liar's Club
The Next Line
Paquet Voleur
Party Game
Pitfall
Reach for the Top
La Roue Chanceuse
SmartAsk
Supermarket Sweep
Talk About
Test Pattern
This Is the Law
TimeChase
Tip of My Tongue
Uh Oh!
Video & Arcade Top 10
Vingt et Un
Who Wants to Be a Millionaire?
You Bet Your Ass

Chile
Atrévase otra vez
A como de lugar
¿Cuánto vale el show?
Trato Hecho, now ¡Allá tú! (Deal or No Deal)
Desafío Familiar (Family Feud)
Diga lo que vale (Chilean version of The Price Is Right)
Hágase Famoso
Hit, la fiebre del karaoke (The Singing Bee)
Hugo (based on the interactive-TV franchise)
El Juego de Judas
Juéguesela en el 13
Jugando a Saber
Un millón para el mejor
Nace una estrella
El Poder del 10 (Power of 10)
Contrareloj (The $25,000 Pyramid; literally means "against the clock")
¿Quién quiere ser millonario?, now ¿Quién merece ser millonario? (Who Wants to be a Millionaire?)
¿Quién soy Yo? (What's My Line?)
El rival más débil (Chilean version of The Weakest Link)
La Rueda de la Fortuna (Wheel of Fortune)
Sábado Gigante
¿Sabes más que un niño de 5to básico? (Are You Smarter Than a 5th Grader?)
Superdupla
Supermarket (Supermarket Sweep)
El Tiempo Es Oro
El último pasajero

China

CCTV 1
 Wei Ni Er Zhan I Fight For You (You Deserve It) (2013)
 Mengxiang Hechangtuan 梦想合唱团 (Clash of the Choirs) (2011)
 正大综艺-墙来啦 (Brain Wall) (2010)
 超级保姆 (Supernanny)
 Into the Shangri-La 走入香格里拉 (Survivor (franchise)) (2001)

Dragon TV
 动洞墙 (Brain Wall)
 Chinese Idol (2013-2014)
 與星共舞 (Dancing with the Stars) (2014-2015)
 Zheng Fen Duo Miao 争分夺秒 (Minute to Win It) (2013)
 So You Think You Can Dance: Wǔ Lín Zhēngbà (So You Think You Can Dance) (2013)
 Mèng lìfāng 梦立方 (The Cube) (2012-2013)
 MasterChef China (2012-2013)
 发动奇迹 (Shear Genius) (2011)
 China's Got Talent (2010-2014)
 The Amazing Race: China Rush (2010-2012)
 Jiātíng Sài Lè Sài 家庭赛乐赛 (Family Feud) (2010-2011)

Zhejiang TV
 So You Think You Can Dance: Zhōngguó Hǎo Wǔdǎo (So You Think You Can Dance) (2014)
 Who dares to stand out? 谁敢站出来 (Breakaway) (2013)
 Splash! (Celebrity Splash!) (2013)
 The Voice of China (2012-2015)
 Wangpai die zhong die 王牌碟中谍 (PokerFace) (2012-2014)
 Xin Tiao A Gen Ting 心跳阿根廷 (101 Ways to Leave a Gameshow) (2012)
 Dance Your Ass off China (越跳越漂亮) (Dance Your Ass Off) (2012)
 Ai Chang Cai Hui Ying 爱唱才会赢 (Deal or No Deal) (2008-2010)

Jiangsu TV
 Zhima kaimen 芝麻开门 (Raid the Cage)
 Yizhan Daodi 一站到底 (Who's Still Standing?)
 The Biggest Loser: 减出我人生 (The Biggest Loser)
 Kàn Jiàn Nǐ De Shēng Yīn 看见你的声音 (I Can See Your Voice) (2016)
 Sasuke China: X Warrior (Ninja Warrior) (2015)
 If You Are the One 非诚勿扰 (Taken Out) (2010)

Hunan TV
 The Bachelor 黄金单身汉 (2016)
 The X Factor: Zhongguo Zui Qiang Yin (2013)
 Nuren ru ge 女人如歌 (The Winner Is) (2012)
 Bǎi biàn dà kā xiù 百变大咖秀 (Your Face Sounds Familiar) (2012)
 Let's Date 我们约会吧 (Taken Out) (2009)
 以一敌百 (1 vs. 100) (2008-2010)
 Strictly Come Dancing China 舞动奇迹 (Dancing with the Stars) (2007-2011)
 Wŭ nián jí jiù zhù duì 五年级救助队 (Are You Smarter than a 5th Grader?) (2007)
 名声大震 (Just the Two of Us)

Beijing TV
 Quan Shi Ni De 全是你的 (The Price Is Right) (2015)
 Dong Gan Xiu Chang 动感秀场 (Deal or No Deal) (2007)

CCTV 2
 味觉大战 (The Taste) (2013)
 The Biggest Loser: 超级减肥王 (The Biggest Loser) (2013)
 Gòu Wù Jiē 购物街 (The Price Is Right) (2007-2011)
 Xìng yùn 52 xìng yùn kè táng 幸运52 幸运课堂 (Are You Smarter than a 5th Grader?) (2007)
 Lucky 52 (1998-2008)

Guangdong TV
 Cash Cab 超级现金车 (Cash Cab) (2012)
 Wanmei Anlian 完美暗恋 (Dating in the Dark) (2011)
 Shi Bei Qian Jin 十倍钱进 (Power of 10) (2009)
 Wǔ nián jí chā bān shēng 五年级插班生 (Are You Smarter than a 5th Grader?) (2007)
 Shui Xiang Cheng Wei Bai Wan Fu Weng 谁想成为百万富翁 (Who Wants to Be a Millionaire?) (2002-2003)

CCTV 3
 中国正在听 (Rising Star) (2014)

Tianjin TV
 Nĭ néng bì yè ma? 你能毕业吗? (Are You Smarter than a 5th Grader?) (2007)

Shenzhen TV
 The Amazing Race China
 合伙中国人 (Dragons' Den) (2016)
 Shéi bĭ shéi cōng ming 谁比谁聪明 (Are You Smarter than a 5th Grader?) (2007)

Sichuan TV
 Wo Ai Wo De Zhu Guo (I Love My Country) (2009)
 China's Next Top Model (2008-2010)

Shandong TV
 Rang Meng Xiang Fei · Zhi Ming Yi Ji 让梦想飞·智命一击 (Russian Roulette) (2015-2016)

Liaoning TV
 The X Factor: Ji Qing Chang Xiang (2011-2012)

Jiangxi TV
 Challenge the Culture Masters 挑战文化名人 (The Chase) (2014)

Guizhou TV
 Bai Wan Zhi Duo Xing 百万智多星 (Who Wants to Be a Millionaire?) (2007-2008)

Hubei TV
 I Love China (I Love My Country) (2012)

Guangxi TV
 猜的就是你 (Identity) (2013)

Shaanxi TV
 Bù kǎo bù zhī dào 不考不知道 (Are You Smarter than a 5th Grader?) (2007)

Chongqing TV
 China's Next Top Model (2015)

Xiamen Star
 Lao ba pin ba 老爸拼吧 (My Dad Is Better Than Your Dad) (2013)
 The Kids Are All Right 鸡蛋碰石头 (The Kids Are All Right) (2013)

Nanjing TV
 Tài ruò liú qiáng·zhìzhě wéi wáng 汰弱留强·智者为王 (The Weakest Link) (2002-2003)
 Zhìzhě wéi wáng 智者为王 (The Weakest Link) (2004)

Colombia
100 Colombianos Dicen (Colombian version of Family Feud) (Caracol TV 2002–2004, 2017)
Do Re Millones: La Orquesta de la fortuna (Sounds Like A Million) (Caracol TV 2012–2014)
El precio es Correcto (Colombian version of The Price Is Right) (Caracol TV 2011–2014)
¡En sus marcas, listos, ya! (On your marks, get set, go!) (Caracol TV 2011–2012)
La Rueda de la Suerte, now La Rueda de la Fortuna (Colombian version of Wheel of Fortune) (Caracol TV 1998–1999, RCN 2013–2015)
Cazadores de la fortuna (Caracol TV 1998–1999)
1 vs. 100 (RCN 2011–2012)
Locos x la tele, (TV Maniacs) (Caracol TV 2015)
El Jugador (PokerFace) (RCN 2006–2007)
Hay Trato! (Deal or No Deal) (Caracol TV 2004)
Un minuto para ganar (Caracol TV 2010–2012, CityTV 2014)
Boom! (Caracol TV 2017–present)
The Wall (Caracol TV 2018)

Czech Republic
5 proti 5 (Czech Republic's original version of Family Feud)
Chcete být milionářem? (Czech Republic's version of Who Wants to Be a Millionaire?)
AZ-kvíz
AZ-kvíz Junior
Co na to Češi (Czech Republic's version of Family Feud)
Hádej kdo jsem? (Czech Republic's version of What's My Line)
Milionář (Another Czech Republic's version of Who Wants to Be a Millionaire?)
Nejslabsi! Mate Padaka! (The Weakest Link)
Pálí vám to? (Czech Republic's version of Polish Daję słowo)
Riskuj! (Jeopardy!)
Na slepo (Czech Republic's version of Polish Gra W Ciemno)

Denmark
1 mod 100 (1 vs. 100)
Hvem vil være millionær? (Who Wants to Be a Millionaire?)
Hvem vil være millionær? Junior (Who Wants to Be a Millionaire? Junior)
Deal or No Deal
Det Svageste Led (Weakest Link)
Er Du Klogere End En 10-årig? (Are You Smarter Than a 5th Grader?)
Fup eller Fakta (Call My Bluff)
Hul i Hovedet (Human Tetris)
Jeopardy!
Lykkehjulet (Wheel of Fortune)
Paradise Hotel
Så det Synger (The Singing Bee)

Reality shows:
Med kniven for struben (Ramsay's Kitchen Nightmares)
Skønheden og nørden (Beauty and the Geek)
So You Think You Can Dance
Vild med Dans (Dancing with the Stars)

Finland

Original Finnish series
Far Out (game show where two teams did tasks in several European cities; the week's winning team, voted by the TV audience, went to a different city for the following week; the losers had to come back to Finland)
Giljotiini (quiz show where you need to know who doesn't know)
Kymppitonni (word guessing game)
Maailman ympäri (geographical quiz show)
Räsypokka (strip poker show)
Reitti 44 (trip around the world in two teams, including tasks)
Retsi ja Jykke (quiz show, followed by spin-off shows by the same team, until the death of Jyrki Otila [Jykke])
SF-Studio (entertaining quiz show about the latest news)
Suuri kupla (children's game show about the world of comics)
Tuttu juttu (game show full of roses and love about knowing your life partner)

Finnish versions of international series
Biisikärpänen (Finnish version of Singing Bee)
Fiksumpi kuin koululainen (Finnish version of Are You Smarter than a 5th Grader?)
Greed
Haluatko miljonääriksi? (Finnish version of Who Wants to Be a Millionaire?)
Heikoin lenkki (Finnish version of The Weakest Link)
Jeopardy!
Meidän isä on parempi kuin teidän isä (Finnish version of My Dad Is Better Than Your Dad)
Mitä Maksaa (Finnish version of The Price Is Right)
Napakymppi (Finnish version of The Dating Game, not considered officially as the same program in the first years of the show, but eventually the producers admitted the resemblance)
Onnenpyörä (Finnish version of Wheel of Fortune)
Ota tai jätä (Finnish version of Deal or No Deal)
Power of 10
Tuntemattomat (Finnish version of Identity)
Tuubi (Finnish version of Saturday Night Tube)
Uutisvuoto (Finnish version of Have I Got News for You)
Voitto kotiin (Finnish version of Family Feud)

France
La Porte Magique (French version of Break the Bank) (La Cinq)

TF1
 The Voice: la plus belle voix
 The Voice Kids
 Les 12 Coups de Midi (L'eredità)
 Le Grand Concours (Britain's Brainiest Kid)
 The Wall : Face au mur (The Wall)
 Danse avec les stars (Dancing with the Stars)
 ÉXathlon France
 Koh-Lanta (Survivor)
 Koh-Lanta: All-Stars (Survivor Celebrity)
 Ninja Warrior: Le Parcours des héros (Ninja Warrior)
 Boom: Gagner ne tient qu'à un fil! (Boom!) (2015)
 Pas une seconde à perdre! (Five Minutes to a Fortune) (2014)
 The Winner Is (2014)
 Splash: Le Grand Plongeon (Celebrity Splash!) (2013)
 Les Nannies (Supernanny)
 Au Pied du Mur! (1 vs. 100) (2012, 2014)
 Tout le monde aime la France! (I Love My Country) (2012)
 MasterChef France (2010-2015)
 Money Drop (The Million Pound Drop) (2010-2011)
 L'amour est aveugle (Dating in the Dark) (2010)
 Identity (2009-2010)
 Le Plus grand quiz de France (The People's Quiz) (2009)
 La Bataille des Chorales (Clash of the Choirs) (2009)
 Qui peut battre Benjamin Castaldi? (Beat the Star) (2008)
 Jouez pour 5 fois plus (Power of 10) (2008)
 1 contre 100 (1 vs. 100) (2007-2008)
 Je suis une célébrité, sortez-moi de là ! (I'm a Celebrity...Get Me Out of Here!) (2006)
 Crésus (L'eredità) (2005-2006)
 À prendre ou à laisser (Deal or No Deal) (2004-2010)
 La Ferme Célébrités (The Farm) (2004-2005, 2010)
 Zone Rouge (The Chair) (2003-2005)
 Fear Factor France (Fear Factor) (2003-2004)
 L'Île de la tentation (Temptation Island) (2002-2008)
 Attention à la marche ! (2001-2010)
 Star Academy (2001-2008)
 Le maillon faible (The Weakest Link) (2001-2007)
 Qui veut gagner des millions ? (Who Wants to Be a Millionaire?) (2000-2016, 2019-present)
 Le Bigdil (Let's Make a Deal/Big Deal) (1998-2004)
 Chéri Chéries (Man O Man) (1998-1999)
 Des Copains en or (Family Feud) (1996-1997)
 L'Affaire du Siècle (Sale of the Century) (1995)
 Le Chéri de ces dames (Man O Man) (1995)
 Une Famille en Or (Family Feud) (1990-1999, 2007-2014, 2021-present)
 Jeopardy! (1988-1991)
 Le Juste Prix (The Price Is Right) (1987-2001, 2009-2015)
 La Roue de la fortune (Wheel of Fortune) (1987-1997, 2006-2012)
 Tournez Manège! (The Dating Game) (1985-1993, 2009-2010)
 Bimbo face aux Intello (Beauty and the Geek) (Cancelled)

France 2
 Fort Boyard
 Motus (Lingo)
 Les Z'amours (The Newlywed Game)
 N'oubliez pas les paroles! (Don't Forget the Lyrics!)
 Tout le monde veut prendre sa place
 Tout le monde a son mot à dire (The Alphabet Game) (2017)
 Un mot peut en cacher un autre (2015-2016)
 Joker (2015-2016, 2018)
 Pop Show (2015-2016)
 Pyramide (The $10,000 Pyramid) (2014-2015)
 Face à la bande (2014)
 Le Cube (The Cube) (2013)
 Avec ou sans joker (2013)
 Volte Face (Trust) (2012)
 Seriez-vous un bon expert? (2011-2013)
 Chéri(e), fais les valises! (2011)
 Réveillez vos méninges (2010-2011)
 Mot de passe (Million Dollar Password) (2009-2016)
 En toutes lettres (The Alphabet Game) (2009-2011)
 La télé est à vous! (2009-2010)
 Slam (2009)
 Le 4e Duel (2008-2013)
 Secret Story (2007-2015)
 Le marathon des jeux TV (Gameshow Marathon) (2006)
 Tout le monde veut prendre sa place (2006)
 Qui est le bluffeur? (2006)
 Carbone 14 (2006)
 Intervilles (2004-2005-2013)
 Millionnaire (2004-2008)
 Le Brise-cœur (2004)
 La Cible (2003-2006)
 Tout vu tout lu (2003-2006)
 Code de la route (2003-2004, 2011)
 Le Coffre (The Vault) (2003-2004)
 Le Grand Blind Test (2003)
 Trivial Pursuit (2002-2003)
 Le Juste Euro (The Price Is Right) (2001-2002)
 Le Numéro gagnant (Winning Lines) (2001-2002)
 La Gym des neurones (2000-2002)
 Les Forges du désert (1999-2000)
 Et 1, et 2, et 3 ! (1999)
 Les Cinglés de la télé (1999)
 Passe à ton voisin (Hot Streak) (1997)
 Qui est qui? (1996-2002)
 Les Bons Génies (Match Game) (1996)
 N'oubliez pas votre brosse à dents (1994-1996)
 Un pour tous (1993)
 Que le meilleur gagne (Everybody's Equal) (1992-1995, 2012-2015)
 La Piste de Xapatan (1992)
 Dingbats (1992)
 Pyramide (The $10,000 Pyramid) (1991-2003)
 Question de Charme (The Better Sex) (1991-1992)
 Les Clés de Fort Boyard (Fort Boyard) (1990-1991)
 Le Chevalier Du Labyrinthe (Knightmare) (1990-1991)
 L'Arche d'or (Strike It Rich) (1988-1989)
 Les Mariés de l'A2 (The Newlywed Game) (1987-1995)
 L'Academie des 9 (Hollywood Squares) (1982-1991)

M6
 Pékin Express (Peking Express)
 La France a un incroyable talent (Got Talent)
 Cauchemar en cuisine (Ramsay's Kitchen Nightmares)
 Top Chef
 Qui est la taupe? (The Mole) (2015)
 Rising Star (2014)
 Un air de star (Your Face Sounds Familiar) (2013)
 Super Nanny (Supernanny)
 Patron incognito (Undercover Boss)
 Le Meilleur Pâtissier (Bake Off) (2012-2017)
 60 secondes chrono (Minute to Win It) (2012)
 X Factor (2011)
 Total Wipeout (Wipeout) (2009)
 Un Dîner Presque Parfait (Come Dine with Me) (2008)
 Maman cherche l’amour (Must Love Kids) (2008)
 Êtes-vous plus fort qu’un élève de 10 ans ? (Are You Smarter than a 5th Grader?) (2007)
 Incroyable Talent (Got Talent) (2006-2008)
 Top Model (2005-2007)
 L'amour est dans le pré (Farmer Wants a Wife) (2005)
 On a échangé nos mamans (Wife Swap) (2004)
 Nouvelle Star (Idol) (2003-2010, 2017)
 Bachelor, le gentleman célibataire (The Bachelor) (2003-2005)
 Popstars (2001-2007)
 Loft Story (Big Brother) (2001-2002)
 Mission 1 million (Greed) (2000)

France 3
 Des chiffres et des lettres
 Questions pour un Champion (Going for Gold)
 Personne n'y avait pensé! (Pointless)
 Le Kadox (Hollywood Squares) (1998-2000)
 Fa Si La Chanter (Name That Tune) (1994-2000, 2010)
 Les Jeux de 20 heures (1976-1987)

C8
 L'Œuf ou la Poule?
 Guess My Age
 Couple ou pas Couple?
 Hold Up!
 Bachelor, le gentleman célibataire (The Bachelor)
 Family Battle (Family Feud) (2017)
 Still Standing : Qui passera à la trappe ? (Who's Still Standing?) (2016)
 Projet Fashion (Project Runway) (2015)
 À prendre ou à laisser (Deal or No Deal) (2014-2015)
 Le maillon faible (The Weakest Link) (2014-2015)
 Popstars – le duel (Popstars) (2013)
 Nouvelle Star (Idol) (2012-2016)
 Amazing Race : la plus grande course autour du monde! (2012)

TMC
 Une Famille en Or (Family Feud) (2015)
 Got to Dance: Le Meilleur Danseur (Got to Dance) (2015)
 Canapé Quiz (Hollywood Game Night) (2014)
 Le Mur Infernal (Brain Wall) (2007)

W9
Cauchemar en cuisine (US & UK version of Kitchen Nightmares)
Hotel hell (US version of Hotel Hell)
Le convoi de l'extrême (US version of Ice Road Truckers)
Ax men (US version of Ax Men)
Swamp people: chasseurs de croco
Les marseillais à Miami
:fr: Les Ch'tis
La meileure danse (dance contributes)
Popstars (song contributes)
 Séduis-moi...Si tu peux! (Taken Out) (2013)
 Taxi Cash (Cash Cab) (2010)
 X Factor (2009)
 Menu W9 (Takeshi's Castle) (2006)

NT1
 Secret Story
 MasterChef France (2015)
 Super Nanny (Supernanny)
 Bachelor, le gentleman célibataire (The Bachelor) (2013-2016)
 Les Vraies Housewives (The Real Housewives) (2013)
 You Can Dance (So You Think You Can Dance) (2012)

NRJ 12
 L'Academie des 9 (Hollywood Squares) (2015)
 Quizmax (Quizmania) (2007)

France 4
 La Porte ouverte a toutes les fenêtres (Hollywood Squares) (2009-2010)

Germany
Kinder Ruck Zuck (kids German version of Bruce Forsyth's Hot Streak) (Tele 5)

ZDF
 Wetten, dass..?
 Der Quiz-Champion 
 Die Montagsmaler (1974-1996, 2018)
 Rette die Million! (The Million Pound Drop) (2013)
 Auge um Auge (Dog Eat Dog) (2002)
 Ca$h—Das eine Million Mark-Quiz (Greed) (2000-2001)
 Die Pyramide (Pyramid) (1978-1994)
 Der große Preis (1974-1993, 2002-2003)
 Dalli Dalli (1971-1986)
 Der goldene Schuß (The Golden Shot) (1964-1970)

Das Erste
 Gefragt–Gejagt (The Chase)
 Spiel für dein Land - Das größte Quiz Europas
 Sing wie dein Star (Your Face Sounds Familiar) (2014)
 Null Gewinnt (Pointless) (2012-2013)
 Land und Liebe (Farmer Wants a Wife) (2005) (NDR Fernsehen)
 SuperGrips (Blockbusters) (1988-1995)
 Auf Los geht's los (1977-1986)
 Schnickschnack (Match Game) (1975-1977)
 Am laufenden Band (The Generation Game) (1974-1979)
 Spiel ohne Grenzen (1965-1999)
 Einer wird gewinnen (1964-2014)
 Was bin ich? (What's My Line?) (1961-1989) (Bayerischer Rundfunk)
 Haetten Sie's gewusst? (Twenty-One) (1958-1969)
 Tick-Tack-Quiz (Tic-Tac-Dough) (1958-1967)

RTL
 Wer wird Millionär? (Who Wants to Be a Millionaire?)
 500 - Die Quiz-Arena (500 Questions)
 The Wall
 Das Supertalent (Got Talent)
 Deutschland sucht den Superstar (Idol)
 Deutschland sucht den Superstar Kids (Idol Kids)
 Ich bin ein Star – Holt mich hier raus! (I'm a Celebrity...Get Me Out of Here!)
 Let's Dance (Dancing with the Stars)
 Sing Mit Mir (All Together Now)
 Es kann nur e1nen geben
 It Takes 2 (Just the Two of Us) (2017)
 Ninja Warrior Germany (Ninja Warrior) (2016)
 Der Restauranttester (Ramsay's Kitchen Nightmares) (2014-2015)
 Rising Star (2014)
 Familien-Duell - Prominenten-Special (Family Feud) (2013-2014)
 Take Me Out - Die neue Dating-Show (Taken Out) (2013)
 Der VIP Bus – Promis auf Pauschalreise (Coach Trip) (2013)
 Die Pool Champions - Promis unter Wasser (Celebrity Splash!) (2013)
 The Cube – Besiege den Würfel! (The Cube) (2011)
 Undercover Boss (2011)
 101 Wege aus der Härtesten Show der Welt (101 Ways to Leave a Gameshow) (2010)
 Dating im Dunkeln (Dating in the Dark) (2010)
 Die Farm (The Farm) (2010)
 Ab Durch die Wand (Brain Wall) (2009)
 Papa gesucht (Must Love Kids) (2009)
 1 gegen 100 (1 vs. 100) (2008)
 Dancing on Ice (2006)
 Rach, der Restauranttester (Ramsay's Kitchen Nightmares) (2005-2013, 2017)
 Peking Express (2005)
 Bauer sucht Frau (Farmer Wants a Wife) (2005)
 Teufels Küche Deutschland (Hell's Kitchen) (2005)
 Die Super Nanny (Supernanny) (2004-2011)
 Big Boss (The Apprentice) (2004)
 Fear Factor (2004)
 Die Bachelorette (The Bachelorette) (2004)
 Der Bachelor (The Bachelor) (2003-2011)
 Der Schwächste fliegt! (The Weakest Link) (2001-2002)
 Big Brother Germany (2000-2011)
 Quiz Einundzwanzig (Twenty-One) (2000-2002)
 Star Weekend (Hollywood Squares) (2000)
 Jeopardy! (1994-1998)
 Familien-Duell (Family Feud) (1992-2003)
 The Gong Show (1992-1993)
 Riskant! (Jeopardy!) (1990-1993)
 Der Preis ist heiß (The Price Is Right) (1989-1997)

SAT.1
 Promi Big Brother
 The Voice of Germany
 The Voice Kids
 The Voice Senior (The Voice)
 Dancing on Ice
 Fort Boyard
 Das große Backen (The Great British Bake Off)
 Mission Familie (Supernanny)
 Newtopia - Vollkommenes Glück oder totales Chaos? (Utopia) (2015)
 Keep your Money (The Million Pound Drop) (2015)
 Deal or No Deal (Deal or No Deal) (2005-2008)
 Hell's Kitchen Deutschland (Hell's Kitchen) (2014)
 Got to Dance (2013-2014)
 The Taste (2013)
 The Biggest Loser Germany (2012-2016)
 The Winner Is (2012)
 Ab durch die Mitte – Das schnellste Quiz der Welt (Who's Still Standing?) (2012)
 Ich liebe Deutschland (I Love My Country) (2011)
 Die perfekte Minute (Minute to Win It) (2010-2014)
 Deutschlands MeisterKoch (MasterChef) (2010)
 You Can Dance (So You Think You Can Dance) (2010)
 Das weiß doch jedes Kind! (Are You Smarter than a 5th Grader?) (2007-2008)
 Deal or No Deal – Die Show der Glücksspirale (Deal or No Deal) (2005-2008)
 Der MillionenDeal (Deal or No Deal) (2004)
 Die Gong-Show (The Gong Show) (2003)
 Die Quiz Show (It's Your Chance of a Lifetime) (2000-2004)
 Die Chance deines Lebens (Deal or No Deal) (2000)
 Sommer sucht Sprosse (Singled Out) (1997)
 Jeder gegen jeden (Fifteen to One) (1996-2001)
 Hast Du Worte? (Pyramid) (1996-1999)
 Bube, Dame, Hörig (Card Sharks) (1996-1999)
 XXO – Fritz & Co (Hollywood Squares) (1995-1997)
 5 mal 5 (Lingo) (1993-1994)
 Geh aufs Ganze! (Let's Make a Deal) (1992-1997)
 Punkt, Punkt, Punkt (Match Game) (1992-1994)
 Bingo (1991-1992)
 Krypton Faktor (The Krypton Factor) (1991)
 Fort Boyard (1990)
 Glücksrad (Wheel of Fortune) (1988-1998)

VOX
 mieten, kaufen, wohnen
 Sing meinen Song – Das Tauschkonzert
 Die Höhle der Löwen (Dragons' Den)
 X Factor Germany (2010-2012)
 Power of 10 (2008)
 Das Perfekte Dinner (Come Dine with Me) (2006)
 Puls Limit: Jeder Herzschlag zählt (The Chair) (2003)
 Hast du Töne? (Name That Tune) (1999-2001)
 Kochduell (1997-2005)

ProSieben
 The Voice of Germany
 Get The F*ck Out Of My House
 Germany's Next Topmodel
 Got to Dance (2013-2015)
 Beauty & The Nerd (Beauty and the Geek) (2013)
 17 Meter (The Whole 19 Yards) (2011)
 Solitary (2010)
 The Biggest Loser Germany (2009)
 WipeOut – Heul nicht, lauf! (Wipeout) (2009)
 Singing Bee (The Singing Bee) (2008)
 Survivor: Überwinde.Überliste.Überlebe! (Survivor) (2007)
 Gameshow-Marathon (Gameshow Marathon) (2007)
 Stars auf Eis (Dancing on Ice) (2007)
 Gülcan und Collien ziehen aufs Land (The Simple Life)
 Schlag den Raab (Beat the Star) (2006-2015)
 Popstars (2003-2012)
 Fort Boyard – Stars auf Schatzsuche (Fort Boyard) (2000-2002)
 Der Maulwurf – Die Abenteuershow (The Mole) (2000-2001)

Kabel Eins
 Fort Boyard (2011)
 The Biggest Loser Germany (2010-2011)
 Quiz Taxi (Cash Cab) (2006)
 Darf man das
 Dingsda (Child's Play) (2001-2002)
 Geh aufs Ganze! (Let's Make a Deal) (1999-2003)
 Glücksrad (Wheel of Fortune) (1998-2002)
 Hugo (1994-1996)

RTL II
 Beat the Blondes (2011)
 Sing! Wenn du kannst (Sing If You Can) (2011)
 Die Wahrheit und nichts als die Wahrheit (Nothing but the Truth) (2008)
 5 gegen 5 (Family Feud) (2006)
 Fame Academy Germany (2003-2004)
 Frauentausch (Wife Swap) (2003)
 Entern oder Kentern (Takeshi's Castle) (2002-2007)
 Deutschland klügste kinder (Britain's Brainiest Kid) (2001-2011)
 Survivor: Überwinde.Überliste.Überlebe! (Survivor) (2001)
 Popstars (2000-2001, 2015)
 Drück Dein Glück (Press Your Luck) (1999)

RTLplus
 Jeopardy!
 Familien-Duell (Family Feud)
 Glücksrad (Wheel of Fortune)
 Ruck Zuck (Bruce Forsyth's Hot Streak)
 Der Preis ist heiß (The Price Is Right)
 Tic-Tac-Toe (Tic-Tac-Dough) (1992)
 Glück am Drücker (Press Your Luck) (1992)

Sky 1
 MasterChef Germany (MasterChef) (2016)

Sport1
 X Factor Germany
 Hopp oder Top (Sale of the Century) (1993)

TLC
 RuPaul's Drag Race

Greece
 Above or Below (Card Sharks)
 Agrótis mónos psáchnei (Farmer Wants a Wife)
 Andres etoimoi gia ola (Man O Man)
 Beat the Blondes
 Big Brother
 Big in Japan (I Survived a Japanese Game Show)
 The Boss has gone mad (Sale of the Century)
 The Purchase of The Century
 Children Play (Child's Play)
 Deal (Deal or No Deal)
 Distraction
 Eísai pio éxypnos apó éna dekáchrono (Are You Smarter than a 5th Grader?)
 Fame Story
 Star Academy
 H timí timí den échei (The Price Is Right)
 House of Fame
 I Stigmi Tis Alithias (Nada más que la verdad / The Moment of Truth)
 Kondres (Family Feud)
 Kontra Plake
 Akou Ti Eipan!
 Akou Ti Eipan! Vradiatika
 5x5
 The List (The Rich List)
 MasterChef Greece
 Junior MasterChef Greece
 Mega Banca (Bob's Full House)
 Mia trypa sto neró (Hole in the Wall)
 Minute to Win It
 Money Drop (The Million Pound Drop)
 O Monomahos (1 vs. 100)
 Fatous Olous
 O Pio Adynamos Krikos (The Weakest Link)
 O trochós tis tíchis (Wheel of Fortune)
 Poios thélei na gínei Ekatommyrioúchos? (Who Wants to Be a Millionaire?)
 Power of 10
 Remote Control
 Rising Star
 Rosiki Rouleta (Russian Roulette)
 Rouk Zouk (Ruck Zuck / Bruce Forsyth's Hot Streak)
 So You Think You Can Dance
 Soúper Márket (Supermarket Sweep)
 Still Standing (Who's Still Standing? / La'uf al HaMillion)
 Ta Tetragona ton asteron (Hollywood Squares)
 Tha peís ki éna tragoúdi (The Singing Bee)
 Top Chef
 The Voice of Greece
 The Voice Kids
 Vres ti Frasi (Catch Phrase)
 What About You? (Break the Bank)
 Tilemplofes (Τηλεμπλόφες)
 Wipeout
 The X Factor
 Your Face Sounds Familiar

Hong Kong
1 vs. 100 (ATV, 2006)
Are You Smarter Than a 5th Grader? (TVB, 2008–2009)
ATM (Action to Money) (now TV, 2011)
ATM Plus (now TV, 2012)
Brain Works (TVB, 2002–2003)
Card Sharks (ATV, 1982)
Deal or No Deal (TVB, 2006–2008)
Everyone Wins (created by Robert Chua) (TVB, 2003)
Identity (TVB, 2008)
Justice for All (TVB, 2005–2006)
Minutes to Fame (TVB, 2005–2007)
Outsmart (TVB, 2009, 2012)
The People Versus (ATV, 2002)
Russian Roulette (TVB, 2002)
Sale of the Century (ATV, 1982)
Super Trio Show (TVB, 1995–2014)
The Vault (ATV, 2002)
The Weakest Link (TVB, 2001–2002)
Who Wants to Be a Millionaire? (ATV, 2001–2005, 2014–)
Who's Still Standing? (TVB, 2014–)

Hungary
1 perc és nyersz! (Hungarian adaptation of Minute to Win It)
A 40 milliós játszma (Hungarian adaptation of The Million Pound Drop)
Activity
Activity - A milliós küldetés
Áll az alku (Hungarian adaptation of Deal or No Deal)
Az igazság ára (Hungarian adaptation of The Prize of Truth)
Az örökös
Csaó, Darwin!
Egy a száz ellen (Hungarian adaptation of 1 vs. 100)
Játékidő
Kapcsoltam
A kód (Hungarian adaptation of The Exit List)
A következő! (Hungarian adaptation of Avanti un altro!)
Kvízió 
Legyen Ön is milliomos (Hungarian adaptation of Who Wants To Be A Millionaire?)
A Leggyengebb Lanczem (Hungarian adaptation of Weakest Link)
Maradj talpon! (Hungarian adaptation of Who's Still Standing?)
Mindent vagy Semmit! (Hungarian adaptation of Jeopardy!)
Multimilliomos
Multimilliomos - Most vagy soha? (Hungarian adaptation of It's Your Chance of a Lifetime)
Négyen négy ellen - A családi játszma or 4N4LN (Hungarian adaptation of Family Feud)
Okosabb vagy, mint egy ötödikes? (Hungarian adaptation of Are You Smarter than a 5th Grader?)
Párbaj (Hungarian adaptation of Duel)
Pókerarc (Hungarian adaptation of PokerFace)
Quizfire - Tűz, víz, kvíz! (Hungarian adaptation of Quizfire)
A széf (Hungarian adaptation of Take It or Leave It)
Szerencsekerék (Hungarian adaptation of Wheel of Fortune)
Zsakbamacska (Hungarian adaptation of Let's Make a Deal)

Iceland
Ertu skarpari en skólakrakki?
Gettu betur
Meistarinn
Útsvar

India
10 Ka Dum (Power of 10)
100% De Dhana Dhan
Aajaa Mahi Vay
Aap Ki Kachehri
Antakshari
Antakshari – The Great Challenge
Arre Deewano Mujhe Pehchano
Athu Ithu Yethu
Bachke Rehnaa Zara Sambhalna (Russian Roulette)
Beauty and the Geek
Bigg Boss (Big Brother)
Biggest Loser Jeetega (The Biggest Loser)
Bollywood Ka Boss
Boogie Woogie
Bournvita Quiz Contest
Chala Change Ka Chakkar
Chhote Ustaad
Chota Packet Bada Dhamaka
Comedy Circus
Comedy Ka Maha Muqqabla
Connexion
Dancing Queen
Deal Ya No Deal
Deal or No Deal (Malayalam)
Deal or No Deal (Tamil)
Deal or No Deal (Telugu)
Dance India Dance
Dance Premier League
Dil Jeetegi Desi Girl
Entertainment Ke Liye Kuch Bhi Karega
Fame X
Fear Factor India
Funjabbi Chak De
Ghazab Desh Ki Ajab Kahaaniyan
The Great Indian Laughter Challenge
India's Magic Star
Jalwa Four 2 Ka 1
Jeena Isi Ka Naam Hai
Jeeto Chapad Paad Ke
Jo Jeeta Wohi Super Star
Just Dance
Idea Zee Cinestars
Indian Idol
India's Best Cinestars Ki Khoj
India's Got Talent
Iss Jungle Se Mujhe Bachao
It Happens Only In India
Kaiyil Oru Kodi - Are You Ready? (Malayalam version of Million Dollar Drop)
Kaiyil Oru Kodi - Are You Ready? (Tamil version of Million Dollar Drop)
Kam Ya Zyaada
Kamzor Kadi Kaun (The Weakest Link)
Kaun Banega Crorepati (Who Wants to be a Millionaire?)
Khullja Sim Sim (Let's Make A Deal)
Kitchen Champion 4
Kya Aap Paanchvi Pass Se Tez Hain? (Are You Smarter Than a 5th Grader?)
Lead India
Lift Kara De
Mastercard Family Fortunes (Family Fortunes / Family Feud)
MasterChef
MTV Splitsvilla
MTV Stuntmania
Mummy Ke Superstars
Music Ka Maha Muqqabla
Nach Baliye
Nachle Ve with Saroj Khan
Naduvula konjam disturb pannuvom
namma veetu mahalakshmi
National Bingo Night
Neengalum Vellalam Oru Kodi (Tamil version of Who Wants to be a Millionaire?)
Neeya Nana
Ningalkkum Aakaam Kodeeshwaran (Malayalam version of Who Wants to be a Millionaire?)
Oru Varthai Oru Latcham
Pati, Patni Aur Woh
Perfect Bride
Rakhi ka Insaaf
Roadies
Sa Re Ga Ma
Sa Re Ga Ma Pa
Saap Seedhi
Sajid's Superstars
Sawaal Dus Crore Ka
Shabaash India
Sitaare Zameen Par
Survivor India – The Ultimate Battle
Swayamvar
Thatt Antha Heli
Thirukkural Payanam
Tol Mol Ke Bol
Voice of India
Waar Parriwar
Wife Bina Life
X Factor India
Yeh Shaam Mastani
Zara Nachke Dikha
Zor Ka Jhatka: Total Wipeout

Indonesia

RCTI
 Who's on Top? (2017-2018)
 Siapa Lebih Berani (2009-2010)
 The Price Is Right Indonesia (The Price Is Right)
 Gong Show (The Gong Show) (2019-2020)
 Sasuke Ninja Warrior Indonesia
 X Factor Indonesia
 Iron Chef Indonesia (Iron Chef) (2017)
 Millionaire Hot Seat (Millionaire Hot Seat) (2010)
 Hole in the Wall (Brain Wall) (2007)
 Deal Or No Deal Indonesia (2007-2008)
 Fear Factor Indonesia (Fear Factor) (2005)
 Who Wants To Be A Millionaire? Indonesia (2001-2006)
 Tebak Gambar (Catchphrase) (2001-2003)
 Kata Berkait (Chain Reaction) (1995-2001)
 Piramida (Pyramid) (1995-2000)
 Piramida Baru (Pyramid) (2001-2003)
 Tak-Tik-BOOM (Tic-Tac-Dough) (1992-1998, 2010)

ANTV
 Super Family 100 (Family Feud) (2016)
 Super Deal (Let's Make a Deal) (2014-2015, 2016)
 Deal Or No Deal Indonesia (2011-2012)
 Katakan Katamu (All New Hot Streak) (2010-2011)
 Super Family (Family Feud) (2009-2011)
 Taxi Selebritis (Cash Cab) (2009)
 Super Deal (Let's Make a Deal) (2006-2007, 2010-2011)
 Super Milyarder 3 Milyar (Who Wants to Be a Millionaire?) (2006-2007)
 Super Rejeki 1 Milyar (Card Sharks) (2006-2007)
 Roda Impian (Wheel of Fortune) (2003-2005)
 Aksara Bermakna (Blockbusters) (1997-1998)
 Famili 100 (Family Feud) (1995-1998)
Killer Karaoke (Sing If You Can) (2019)
Geser Balok (Serlok) (as the part of Pesbukers segment) (Blockout) (2019-present)
Siapa Paling Berani (2011)
Satu Huruf Dong (2002-2003)

SCTV

 Chance of a Lifetime (It's Your Chance of a Lifetime) (2004)
 Roda Impian (Wheel of Fortune) (2001-2002)
 Detak-Detik (Every Second Counts) (1997-1999)
 Bulan Madu (The Newlywed Game) (1995)
Serbuuu!
Cepat Tepat Dapat (CTD) (2000-2001)
Tantangan 1 Milyar (Lose A Million) (1997)
Coba-Coba Kata (Cocok) (Lingo) (1996-1998)

Indosiar
 New Famili 100 (Family Feud) (2013-2015)
 1 Lawan 100 (1 vs. 100) (2010-2011)
 The Price Is Right (2010-2011)
 Indonesia's Got Talent (2010)
 Take Me Out Indonesia (2009-2012)
 Happy Song (The Singing Bee) (2008)
 Roda Impian Pilih atau Dia (Wheel of Fortune) (2006)
 The Apprentice Indonesia (The Apprentice) (2005)
Kuis Siapa Berani (2000-2005)
 Famili 100 (Family Feud) (1999-2004)
 Selebritis Indonesia (Hollywood Squares) (1999-2002)

GTV (Global TV)

 Family 100 Indonesia (Family Feud)
 Super Family 100 (Family Feud) (2021)
 Super Deal Indonesia (Let's Make a Deal)
 Match Game Indonesia (Match Game)
 Komunikata Indonesia (Bruce Forsyth's Hot Streak)
 Deal Or No Deal Indonesia (2014-2015)
 Are You Smarter than a 5th Grader? Indonesia (Are You Smarter than a 5th Grader?) (2009-2010)
 Hole in the Wall (Brain Wall) (2009)
 Password Jutawan (Million Dollar Password) (2008-2009)
 30 Detik Menjadi Bintang (30 Seconds to Fame) (2005)
 Pimp My Ride Indonesia (Pimp My Ride) (2002-2014)
Take It or Leave It (Himmel oder Hölle) (2021-present)

MNCTV (TPI)

 I Can See Your Voice
 Minute to Win It Indonesia (Minute to Win It)
 Benteng Takeshi Indonesia (Takeshi's Castle)
 Indonesian Idol Junior (2014-2017)
 Komunikata (Bruce Forsyth's Hot Streak) (2000-2005)

Trans7
 Berpacu Dalam Melodi (Name That Tune)
 MeLirik Lagu (The Lyrics Board) (2004-2006)
 Famili 100 (Family Feud) (2004-2005)
 Hexagon War (2016-2017)

Trans TV
 Missing Lyrics (Don't Forget the Lyrics!)
 Russian Roulette (Russian Roulette) (2002-2003)
 Tebak Harga (The Price Is Right) (2001-2002, 2003-2005)
Maju Terus Pantang Mundur
Gong Show (The Gong Show) (2006-2012)

NET.
 Celebrity Squares (Hollywood Squares) (2015-2016)
 Berpacu Dalam Melodi (Name That Tune) (2014-2015)

TVRI
 Aksara Bermakna (Blockbusters) (1989-1996)
 Berpacu Dalam Melodi (Name That Tune) (1988-1998, 2013-2014)
Kuis Siapa Berani (2018-2019)

Metro TV
 Supernanny
 Berpacu Dalam Melodi (Name That Tune) (2000-2005)
Gladiator 1 Milyar

Kompas TV
 Temukan Kata (Now You See It) (2012-2013)
Smart Face

tvOne (LaTiVi)
 Super Family 100 (Family Feud) (2017)

MTV Indonesia
 Pimp My Ride Indonesia (Pimp My Ride)

Iran
Mosabegheh Bozorg
Mosabegheh Mahaleh
Mosabegheh Telefoni

Iraq
Bank elma3lumat
jawib wa4ba7
M7ebis

Ireland
 The Apprentice
 The Big Money Game 
 Blackboard Jungle
 Bog Stop
 Cabin Fever 
 Celebrity Farm
 Challenging Times
 Deal or No Deal
 Delegation
 Dodge the Question
 Don't Feed the Gondolas
 Dragons Den
 Fame and Fortune
 Family Fortunes
 Gridlock
 It's Not the Answer 
 The Lyrics Board
 Telly Bingo
 Play the Game
 Quicksilver 
 Talkabout
 Treasure Island
 The Trump Card
 The Weakest Link 
 Who Wants to be a Millionaire? 
 Winning Streak
 Winning Streak: Dream Ticket

Israel
1 vs. 100
Deal or No Deal
HaHulia HaHalasha (Weakest Link)
HaKasefet (The Vault)
Hamesh Hamesh (Ruck Zuck / Bruce Forsyth's Hot Streak)
HaMoach (The Brain)
Lingo
Melekh Ha Trivia (Jeopardy!)
La'uf al HaMillion (the original version of Who's Still Standing?)
Makbilit Ha Mohot (Mastermind)
The Money Pump
Monit HaKesef (Israeli version of Cash Cab)
Pachot O Yoter (The Price Is Right)
Raid the Cage
Toto Mishpachty (Family Feud)
Tots'ot Ha Emet (Power of 10)
Galgal HaMazal (Wheel of Fortune)
Who Wants to Be a Millionaire?

Italy
1 contro 100 (Italian version of Eén tegen 100) (2007-2008)
Affari Tuoi (Italian version of Deal or No Deal) (2003-2017,2020-present)
Anello Debole (Italian version of Weakest Link) (2001)
Avanti un Altro! (2011-present)
Caduta libera (Italian version of La'uf al HaMillion) (2015-present)
Cash Taxi [en] (2009-2010,2012-2013)

Chi vuol essere milionario? (Italian version of Who Wants to be a Millionaire?) (2000-2011,2018-2020)
Rischiatutto (Italian version of Jeopardy!) (1970-1974,2016)
La Ruota Della Fortuna (Italian version of Wheel of Fortune) (1987-2003,2007-2009)
Quiz Show (2000-2002)
Trasformat (2010-2011)
L'eredità (Italian version of El legado) (2002-present)
The Money Drop (Italian version of The £100K Drop) (2011-2013)
Un minuto per vincere (Italian version of Minute to win it) (2011-2013)
The Wall [en] (2017-2019)
Conto alla rovescia (2019-2020)

Japan

Fuji TV
 Vs. Arashi
 Game Center CX
 VivaVivaV6
 Magic Revolution
 Nep League
 Kuizu $ Mirionea クイズ$ミリオネア (Who Wants to Be a Millionaire?) (2000-2013)
 Nippon's Wipeout ワイプアウト日本  (Wipeout) (2013)
 1分間チャレンジ 〜めざせ!100万ドル (Minute to Win It) (2013)
 Terrace House: Boys × Girls Next Door (2012-2014)
 Kyasshukyabu キャッシュキャブ (Cash Cab) (2008)
 Nōkabe 脳カベ (Brain Wall) (2006)
 Quiz! Hexagon II (2005-2011)
 Viking: The Ultimate Obstacle Course (2005-2007)
 IQ Sapuri 脳内エステ IQサプリ (2004-2009)
 Toribia no Izumi トリビアの泉 (2002-2006)
 Uikesutorinku hitori-gachi no hosoku ウィーケストリンク☆一人勝ちの法則 (The Weakest Link) (2002)
 Ainori (1999-2009)
 Ryōri no Tetsujin 料理の鉄人 (Iron Chef) (1993-2002)
 Ai ai gêmu アイ・アイゲーム (Match Game) (1979-1985)
 Quiz Grand Prix クイズグランプリ (Jeopardy!) (1970-1980)
 Quiz! Toshinosa nante クイズグランプリ (1970-1980)

TBS
 The Wall ウォールのライフ
 Sasuke サスケ
 Kunoichi クノイチ (broadcast in U.S. as Women of Ninja Warrior Woman)
 Athletic Fire 炎の体育会TV
 Door of Time 時の扉
 The Pyramid Derby ピラミッドダービー
 Against the Audience ブーイングスタジアム
 Baribari Value (MBS TV)
 Live Live Downtown ダウンタウンdxラインライブ
 All Star Thanksgiving Festival オールスター感謝祭 (Everybody's Equal)
 All Star After Party オールスター後夜祭 (Everybody's Equal) (2018)
 Real Escape Game TV リアル脱出ゲームTV (2013-2014)
 Battle of the Super Boyz 究極の男は誰だ!?最強スポーツ男子頂上決戦 (2012-2013)
 ¥20,000,000 Quiz! Money Drop 2000万円クイズ! マネードロップ (The Million Pound Drop) (2012)
 King of Chair キングオブチェアー (2010-2011)
 Monster Stairs モンスターステアーズ
 Lucked Out お笑い運試し
 テイク・ミー・アウト (Taken Out) (2009)
 Za Dīru ザ・ディール (Deal or No Deal) (2006-2007)
 The Chair ザ・チェアー (The Chair) (2005)
 Sabaibā サバイバ (Survivor) (2002-2003)
 Aim for the Bouquet ブーケをねらえ！ (2002-2003)
 Drunken Businessmen
 Super Human Coliseum
 Food Battle Club (2001-2002)
 Brain Survivor ブレイン･サバイバー (2000)
 Happy Family Plan しあわせ家族計画 (1997-2000)
 Get 100 100げっちゅ〜
 Street Fight ストリートファイト
 Kinniku Banzuke (1995-2002)
 Tokyo Friend Park 2 (1994-2011)
 Amazing Animals どうぶつ奇想天外! (1993-2009)
 Quiz! Atatte 25% (Everybody's Equal) (1991-1992)
 Fūun! Takeshi-jō 風雲！たけし城 (Takeshi's Castle) (1986-1990)
 Waku Waku Animal Land わくわく動物ランド (1983-1992)
 Quiz 100nin ni kikimashita (Family Feud) (1979-1992)
 Za cha-n-su ザ・チャンス！ (The Price Is Right) (1979-1986)
 Quiz Derby (Celebrity Sweepstakes) (1976-1992)
 3 times 3 is quiz (Hollywood Squares) (1970-1971)

Nippon TV
 AKBingo!
 Downtown no Gaki no Tsukai ya Arahende!!
 Sekai No Hatte Madde Itte Q
 Burning Questions!
 Battle of the Homes
 Celebrity Style Battle
 Love Liar
 The Great Grandpa!
 Millionaire on a Roll - 24H Challenge
 Fools for Love
 Would You Pay?
 Happy House Cleaning
 Brain Athlete
 The Queen of Recipes
 Pharaoh!
 Perfect Balance!
 Human Arcade
 Key Master
 Psycho Battle
 SHOW os SHOWS - Your Choice, Your Show
 TRAIN OF THOUGHT
 TRUTH OR DOUBT
 EXIT!
 Takara-Sagashi Adventure Nazotoki Battle Tore! (2011-2013)
 Kuizu anata wa shogaku 5-nensei yori kashikoi no? (Are You Smarter than a 5th Grader?) (2011)
 Missitsu Nazotoki Variety Dasshutsu Game Dero! (2009-2011)
 Shall We Dance? (Strictly Come Dancing)
 Truth or Doubt (2004-2005)
 マネーの虎 (Dragons' Den) '(2001-2004)
 Let's Wakey Wakey
 Move This; It's Yours!
 Party of Six
 Quiz Stadium
 SAMURAI 5
 SHAMROCK
 GOCHI
 Who do YOU Choose?
 Magical Brain Power (brain-intensive game show)
 Susunu! Denpa Shonen (1998-2002)
 Ikkaku senkin! 一攫千金!!スーパーマーケット (Supermarket Sweep) (1991)
 Quiz sekaiha show by syoubai (1988-1996)
 Liar Quiz (Hollywood Squares) (1979-1980)
 Quiz Square (Hollywood Squares) (1980)

TV Asahi
 Panel Quiz Attack 25
 Cream Stew Quiz Miracle 9 (くりぃむクイズ ミラクル9)
 Time Shock
 Brainiest ブレイニスト (Britain's Brainiest Kid) (2012)
 Easy Peasy
 Challengers on Fire
 Noisy Neighbors
 Ranking the Stars
 9 VS 9
 GO BABY GO
 Battle of the Budgets
 Car Puzzle
 Intimate Ties
 No Brainer
 The BLOCKS
 The FACTORY
 BAZOOKA
 Bounty Hunter
 Pressure Relay
 Pressure Study
 Quiz Hunter
 Treasure Hunting Elevator
 10 Requirements to Marry a Millionaire
 A 12-Hour Game of Tag: A Test of Endurance
 Absolute Taste
 Domino Dare
 Fidelity Test
 Give Me a Clue
 Party Games
 Quiz 5 x 5
 Right Turn Only
 Shifty Eyes
 The Voice 日本 (The Voice) (2019)

TV Tokyo
 Terebi Champion TVチャンピオン (1992-2008)
 Asayan (1995-2002)

NHK
 Fukumen Research Boss Sennyū (Undercover Boss)
 Doctor G's Case File
 (Hold On To Your Seat)

Tokyo MX

Okinawa TV
 X Factor Okinawa Japan (The X Factor) (2013-2014)

Korea, South
1 vs. 100
The Golden Bell Challenge
Goldfish (황금어장)
Heroine Six
I Can See Your Voice
Infinity Challenge
Itta! Eoptta
JangHak Quiz (since 1973, awarding scholarships to winning students)
Let's Speak Korean: The Game
Quiz Champions
Quiz DaeHanMinGuk
Ring The Golden Bell (for high school students)
The Star Golden Bell Challenge
Star King
Super Viking
Superkids
The Genius: Rule Breaker
Wits In Korean Language
Ya Shim Man Man

Lebanon
Comikaze (on Lebanese Broadcasting Corporation)
Truth X-Press (on SAT-7 ARABIC)
 Elhalka Eladaaf  (2001-2003) (The Arabic version of The Weakest Link ) on Future Television

Macedonia
50/50 (2WayTraffic format)
Кој сака да биде милионер? (Macedonian version of Who Wants to be a Millionaire?)
 Најслаба алкa ( Macedonian version of The Weakest Link )
Добра Шанса
Земи или остави (Macedonian version of Deal or No Deal)
Тркало на среќата (Macedonian version of Wheel of Fortune)
Ба ба бум (2WayTraffic format)
Бројки и букви

Malta

ONE TV
HazZzard (2006–2007, 2012–present)
The Kilo Challenge (possibly a Maltese version of The Biggest loser) (2008–2009, 2011–present)
Liquorish (2011–present)

TVM
Deal or No Deal (2008–2010)
Divided (2009–2010)
Ħadd Għalik? (A Sunday For You?) (2008–present)
Il-Kunjata (The Mother-in-law) (2010)
Kwizzun (The Quiz) (2011–2013)
L-Ispjun (The Spy Maltese version of Big Brother) (2007–2008)
Liquorish (2006–2010)
Puree (2011–2013)
Studio 54 (2010–2011)

Net TV
Kontra l-Ħin (Against The Time, possibly a Maltese version of Beat the Clock) (2006–2007, 2009–present)
Puree (2009–2010, 2018–present)

Malaysia
Anda Ada 60 Saat (Malaysian version of Minute to Win It)
Betul ke Bohong?
Celebrity Squares (Malaysian version of Hollywood Squares) (defunct or not continued)
Deal Or No Deal (With two versions in English and Chinese)
Famili Ceria (Malaysian version of Family Feud) (defunct or not continued)
Fear Factor Malaysia (Malaysian version of Fear Factor)
Jangan Lupa Lirik! (Malaysian version of Don't Forget The Lyrics!)
Rawana (Malaysian version of Tod Sa Gun Game)
Roda Impian (Malaysian Version of Wheel Of Fortune)
Serasi Bersama (Malaysian version of Mr. and Mrs.)
The Weakest Link (Malaysian version of The Weakest Link) (to be announced)
Who Wants to be a Millionaire? (with two versions in Malay and Chinese)

Mexico
1 Minuto Para Ganar (Mexican version of One Minute to Win it)
100 Mexicanos Dijeron (Mexican version of Family Feud) (2001–2005, 2009–present)
Atínale al Precio (Mexican version of The Price Is Right) (1997–2001, 2010–present)
¡Buenas Tardes! (2006)
Al Final Todo Queda en Familia (2018)
Mi Pareja Puede (My husband do it) (2018)
La Silla (2006)
Corre GC corre
Doble Cara (Mexican version of Poker Face)
La Energía de Sonric'slandia (children's game show)
Escape perfecto (Mexican version of Perfect Escape)
Espacio en Blanco (Mexican version of Match Game) (2006)
Factor Miedo (Mexican version of Fear Factor)
En Familia con Chabelo
Aguas con el Muro (Mexican version of Hole in the Wall)
El Juego de la Oca
¡Boom!
¡Llévatelo! (Take It!) (1993–1995)
No Pierdas El Billete (Mexican version of Don't Lose the Money)
Password: La Palabra Secreta
¿Quien Tiene Estrella? (Mexican version of America's Got Talent)
El Reto Burundis (Challenge of the Burundis)
La Rueda De La Fortuna (Mexican version of Wheel of Fortune)
Sexos en Guerra (Mexican version of La Guerra de los Sexos) (2003–2005)
Todo o Nada(all or nothing)
TVO (1991-1993)
Vas O No Vas (Mexican version of Deal or No Deal) (2004–2006)
Viva el Show
El Juego de las Estrellas (Mexican version of The Stars Game Show)
Recuerda y Gana (Remember to win)
El Rival Más Débil (Mexican version of The Weakest Link)
XE-TU
XE-TU Remix
Fantástico Amor

Netherlands
1 tegen 100 (original format of 1 vs. 100)
1-2-3-Show
2 voor 12
5 Golden Rings
7 Plagen
Achmea Kennisquiz J/M
Adam Zkt. Eva
AVRO's Wie-kent-kwis
Binnen De Minuut
Boggle
Bommetje!
Doet-ie 't of doet-ie 't niet
Eén van de acht (original format of The Generation Game)
De Frank Kramer Show
Het Moment Van De Waarheid (Nada más que la verdad)
I Can See Your Voice
Ik hou van Holland
It's All in the Game
De Jongens tegen de Meisjes
De Knock-Out Show
De Kwis
De Lama's
Lingo
Lotto Weekend Miljonairs (Who Wants to Be a Millionaire?)
Lucky Letters
Mike and Thomas Show
Postcode Loterij Miljoenenjacht (original format of Deal or No Deal)
Peking Express
Per Seconde Wijzer
Postcode Loterij Recordshow
Succes verzekerd
Te land, ter zee en in de lucht
Vijf tegen Vijf (Family Feud)
VriendenLoterij Miljonairs (Who Wants to Be a Millionaire?)
Wie ben ik?
Wie is de Mol? (Dutch TV series)
De Zeven Zeeën
De Zwakste Schakel (Weakest Link)

New Zealand
Are You Smarter Than A 10 Year Old? (NZ version of Are You Smarter Than A 5th Grader?)
Cash Battle (New Zealand version of Polish Awantura o kasę)
Deal or No Deal
The Great New Zealand Spelling Bee
It's Academic
It's in the Bag
The Weakest Link
Top Town
University Challenge
W3
Wheel of Fortune
Who Wants to Be a Millionaire?

Norway
Deal or No Deal
Det svakeste ledd ( The Norwegian version of The Weakest Link )
Kvitt eller dubbelt
Norske Talenter
Vil du bli millionær? (Who Wants to Be a Millionaire?)

Pakistan
Bazm E Tariq Aziz
BOL Champions
Croron Mein Khel
Challenger
Foodistan
Game Show Aisay Chalay Ga
Geo Khelo Pakistan
Inaam Ghar
Inaam Ghar Plus
Jeet Ka Dum
Jeeto Pakistan
Jeeto Pakistan League
Jeeway Pakistan
Kya Aap Banaingay Crorepati?
Khush Raho Pakistan
Looto Game
Living on the Edge
Malamal Express
Madventures
Pakistan Idol
Pepsi Battle of the Bands
Survivor Pakistan
The Weakest Link ( The Pakistani version of The Weakest Link )

Panama
100 Panameños Dicen (Panamanian version of Family Feud)
Bailando por un Sueño
El Bille Show
El Familion
LG Quiz
Tu dia de suerte
Vive la Musica

Philippines

ABS-CBN
1 vs. 100
Bet on Your Baby
Celebrity Playtime
Everybody Sing
Family Feud
Game ng Bayan
Games Uplate Live
I Can See Your Voice
It's Showtime
Kapamilya, Deal or No Deal
Little Big Star
Little Big Superstar
Minute to Win it
Pilipinas, Game KNB?
Pilipinas Got Talent
Pinoy Big Brother
Pinoy Bingo Night
Pinoy Fear Factor
The Price Is Right
The Singing Bee
Star in a Million
Star Power
Wheel of Fortune
Wowowee
The X Factor Philippines

GMA
All-Star K! The 1 Million Peso Videoke Challenge
All-Star Videoke
Asar Talo Lahat Panalo!
BandaOke: Rock n' Roll to Millions
Celebrity Bluff
Digital LG Quiz
Don't Lose the Money
Eat Bulaga!
Family Feud
GoBingo
Kakasa Ka Ba Sa Grade 5?
Nuts Entertainment
People vs. the Stars
Picture! Picture!
Power of 10
Ready, Text, Go!
Tok! Tok! Tok! Isang Milyon Pasok!
Wachamakulit
Whammy! Push Your Luck
Wowowin

PTV
PCSO Lottery Draw
Play n' Win

TV5
1000 Heartbeats Pintig Pinoy
Bawal Na Game Show
Easy Money: Ang Cash Ng Bayan
Family Feud
Fill In The Bank
Go For It!
Let's Ask Pilipinas
The Million Peso Money Drop
The Price Is Right
Puso O Pera
Rolling In It Philippines
The Wall Philippines
The Weakest Link
Wheel of Fortune
Who Wants to Be a Millionaire?
Wil Time Bigtime
Win Win Win
Wowowillie

Q (Quality Television)
Now Na!

IBC
Islands Game Masters
The Weakest Link
Who Wants to Be a Millionaire?

RPN
Battle of the Brains
Family Kwarta o Kahon
Spin-A-Win
Super Suerte sa 9

UNTV
Bihasa: Biblya Hamon Sa'yo
Campus Challenge

Studio 23
Kabarkada, Break the Bank

Net 25
Tara Game, Agad Agad

Poland

Currently airing (Fall 2020) 
 TVP 1:
 Jeden z dziesięciu (Fifteen to One; formerly on TVP 2)
 Jaka to melodia? (Name That Tune)
 Gra słów. Krzyżówka
 TVP 2:
 Familiada (Family Feud)
 Koło Fortuny (Wheel of Fortune)
 Postaw na milion (The Money Drop; formerly on TVP 1, originally on TVP 2)
 Va banque (Jeopardy!)
 TVN:
 Milionerzy (Who Wants to Be a Millionaire?)
 TVP 3:
 Sukces na bank
 TVP Historia:
 Giganci historii
 Super Polsat:
 Łowcy nagród

Major former formats 
 TVP 1
 21 (21)
 Miliard w rozumie
 Miliard Junior
 The Wall. Wygraj marzenia (The Wall; last five episodes on TVP 2)

 TVP 2
 Dzieciaki górą! (The Kids are all Right)
 Gilotyna (L'Eredità)
 Krzyżówka szczęścia (The Cross-Wits)
 Magia liter
 Moja klasa – Back to School
 Oto jest pytanie (That’s the Question)
 Tak to leciało! (Don't Forget the Lyrics!)
 Wielka gra (Double Your Money)
 Wielki Poker (PokerFace)

 Polsat
 Awantura o kasę
 Chciwość, czyli żądza pieniądza (Greed)
 Eureko, ja to wiem! (Ahmea Kennisquiz)
 Gra w ciemno
 Grasz czy nie grasz (Deal or No Deal)
 Idź na całość (Let’s Make a Deal)
 Kalambury
 Moment prawdy (The Moment of Truth)
 Piramida (The $10,000 Pyramid)
 Rekiny kart (Card Sharks)
 Rosyjska ruletka (Russian Roulette)
 Rozbij bank (Hit the Bank?)
 Strzał w 10 (Power of 10)
 Życiowa szansa (It’s Your Chance of a Lifetime)

 TV 4
 Daję słowo (?)
 Gdzie jest kłamczuch? (Dirty Rotten Cheater)
 Hole in the Wall (Hole in the Wall)
 Przetrwanie

 TVN
 Dobra cena (The Price Is Right)
 Dzieciaki z klasą (Britain's Brainiest Kid)
 Milion w minutę (Minute to Win it)
 Najsłabsze ogniwo (The Weakest Link)
 Oko za oko (Dog Eat Dogs)

 TV Puls
 Bankomat. Wyścig z czasem (The ATM)
 Czy jesteś mądrzejszy od 5-klasisty? (Are you Smarter than a 5th Grader?)
 Następny, proszę! (Next One!)
 Gra muzyka

 Super Polsat
 Joker (Joker)
 Taxi kasa (Cash Cab; formerly on TV4 as Taxi)

Portugal
Chamar a música (Portuguese version of The Singing Bee, 2008–present - Herman José)
Dança Comigo (Portuguese version of Dancing with the Stars, 2006–2008 - Catarina Furtado, Sílvia Alberto)
Decisão Final (Portuguese version of Russian Roulette, 2012–2013 - José Carlos Malato)
Em Família (Portuguese version of Family Feud, 2006 - Fernando Mendes)
Fear Factor - Desafio Total (Portuguese version of Fear Factor, 2003–2004 - José Carlos Araújo, Leonor Poeiras)
O Elo Mais Fraco (Portuguese version of Weakest Link, 2002–2004, 2011-2012 - Júlia Pinheiro, Luísa Castel-Branco, Pedro Granger )
O Momento da Verdade (Portuguese version of Nada mas que la verdad, 2008–present - Teresa Guilherme)
O Preço Certo (Portuguese version of The Price Is Right, 2002–present - Fernando Mendes)
Roda da Sorte (Wheel of Fortune, 1991–1993, 2008– - Herman José with Ruth Rita (1st version) and Vanessa Palma (2nd version))
Quando o Telefone Toca (Portuguese version of Quizmania, 2007–2008 - Vanessa Palma, Patrícia Henrique, Quimbé)
Quem Quer Ganha (Portuguese version of PPuzzeltijd)
Quem quer ser milionário? (Portuguese version of Who Wants To Be A Millionaire,  2013–present - Manuela Moura Guedes)
Sabe Mais do que um Miúdo de Dez Anos (Portuguese version of Are You Smarter Than a 5th Grader?, - 2007–2008 - Jorge Gabriel)
Sempre a Somar
Um Contra Todos (Portuguese version of 1 vs. 100, 2005–2006 - José Carlos Malato)

Puerto Rico
Control Remoto (Puerto Rican version of MTV's Remote Control)
Sabado en Grande
Super Sabado
A Millón
A Toda Maquina

Russia
12 Negrityat
Alfavit
Allo, TV!
Dom
Golod
Klub Byvshikh Zhen
Koleso Istorii
Lzhec
Nastoyaschij Muzhchina
Papa, Mama, Ya
Sem' Pod Solncem
Shestoye Chuvstvo
Stavka
V Temnote
Vozmozhnosti Plasticheskoj Khirurgii
Vremya - Den'gi!
Za Sem'yu Pechatyami

Russia 1
 Sto k Odnomu (Family Feud)
 Narodniy Artist (Idol)
 Стена (The Wall) (2017)
 Glavnaya Stsena (The X Factor) (2015)
 Odin v odin! (Your Face Sounds Familiar) (2014-2016)
 Kletka (Raid the Cage) (2014)
 Артист (Artist) (Rising Star) (2014)
 Pursuit (The Chase) (2012-2013)
 Minutnoe Delo (Minute to Win It) (2012)
 Битва хopов (Clash of the Choirs) (2012)
 Faktor A (The X Factor) (2011-2013)
 Shou Desyat' Millionov (The Million Pound Drop) (2010-2014)
 50 Blondinok (Beat the Blondes) (2008)
 Tantsy So Zvyozdami (Dancing with the Stars) (2005-2016)
 Sekret Uspekha (The X Factor) (2005-2007)
 Piramida (Pyramid) (2004-2005)
 Форт Боярд (Fort Boyard) (2002-2004)
 Dva Royalya (The Lyrics Board) (1998-2003, 2010-2011)
 Proshche Prostogo (Hollywood Squares) (1996-1997)

Channel One
 Голос (The Voice)
 Голос. Дети (The Voice Kids)
 Голос. 60+ (The Voice Senior)
 Kto khochet stat' millionerom? (Who Wants to Be a Millionaire?)
 Pole Chudes (Wheel of Fortune)
 Chto? Gde? Kogda? (What? Where? When?)
 Ugadai Melodiyu (Name That Tune)
 Stenka na Stenku (Brain Wall)
 Minuta Slavy (Got Talent)
 Pobedytel' (The Winner Is) (2017)
 Русский ниндзя (Ninja Warrior) (2017)
 Форт Боярд (Fort Boyard) (2014)
 Toch-v-Toch (Your Face Sounds Familiar) (2014)
 Odin v odin! (Your Face Sounds Familiar) (2013)
 Vyshka (Celebrity Splash!) (2013)
 Kub (The Cube) (2013)
 Detektor Lji (Nada más que la verdad) (2010)
 Zhestokiye Igry (Wipeout) (2010)
 Magiya Desyati (Power of 10) (2008)
 Mozhesh? Spoy! (The Singing Bee) (2008)
 Tsirk so Zvezdami (Celebrity Circus) (2007)
 Lednikovniy Period (Dancing on Ice) (2006-2016)
 Pan ili Propal (Deal or No Deal) (2004-2005)
 Fabrika Zvyozd (Star Academy) (2002-2011)
 Russkaya Ruletka (Russian Roulette) (2002-2004)
 Posledniy Geroy (Survivor) (2001-2005, 2008-2009)
 Slaboe Zveno (The Weakest Link) (2001-2005)
 Poymy Menya (Bruce Forsyth's Hot Streak) (1995-1996)
 Narod Protiv (The People Versus)

NTV
 Svoya Igra (Jeopardy!)
 Трудно быть боссом (Undercover Boss)
 Ustami Mladenca (Child's Play)
 Iz Pesni Slov Ne Vykinesh (Don't Forget the Lyrics!) (2013)
 Tsena Udachi (The Price Is Right) (2005-2006)
 Faktor Strakha (Fear Factor) (2002-2005)
 Alchnost (Greed) (2001-2002)
 О, счастливчик! (Who Wants to Be a Millionaire?) (1999-2001)
 Chto? Gde? Kogda? (What? Where? When?) (1999-2000)
 Форт Боярд (Fort Boyard) (1998)
 Proshche Prostogo (Hollywood Squares) (1997)
 Poymy Menya (Bruce Forsyth's Hot Streak) (1995-1996)
 Lyubov' s Pervogo Vzglyada (The Dating Game)

Channel 5
 Slaboye Zveno (The Weakest Link) (2007-2008)

REN TV
 Takeshi Kitano's Castle (Takeshi's Castle)
 Адская Кухня (Hell's Kitchen) (2012-2013)
 Суперняня (Supernanny) (2008)
 Sdelka (Deal or No Deal) (2006)
 Zvanyy Uzhin (Come Dine with Me) (2006)
 Krasavitsy i Umniki (Beauty and the Geek) (2005)
 Ostrov Iskushenij (Temptation Island) (2005)

TNT
 Где логика?
 Holostyak (The Bachelor) (2013)
 Kto ne chočet stat millionerom? (Unan1mous) (2008)
 Intuyitsiya (Identity) (2007-2013)
 Kandidat (The Apprentice) (2005-2007)
 Bolshoy Brat (Big Brother) (2005)
 Taxi (Cash Cab) (2005)

CTC
 Vzveshenniye lyudi (The Biggest Loser)
 Moy Papa Kruche! (My Dad Is Better Than Your Dad) (2016)
 МастерШеф (MasterChef) (2013-2014)
 Детские шалости (Child's Play) (2008-2009)
 Kto umnee 5-klassnika? (Are You Smarter than a 5th Grader?) (2007-2008)
 Zvonok (The Phone) (2007)
 Ty - supermodel (Top Model) (2004-2007)
 Sami‘y Umni‘y (Britain's Brainiest Kid) (2003-2012)
 Kreslo (The Chair) (2002-2004)

TV3
 Semyeinyi Prigovor (The Marriage Ref) (2011)

TV Center
 Odin Protiv Vseh (1 vs. 100) (2007-2009)
 Dva Royalya (The Lyrics Board) (2004-2005)
 Sto k Odnomu (Family Feud) (1997-1998)

2x2
 Японские забавы (Takeshi's Castle) (2011-2012, 2013-2014)

Russia-K
 Genij (Mastermind)

Pyatnica!
 Экс на пляже (Ex on the Beach) (2017)
 Iz Pesni Slov Ne Vykinesh (Don't Forget the Lyrics!) (2013)
 Пой (если сможешь) (Sing If You Can) (2013)

Muz-TV
 Novaya Fabrika Zvyozd (Star Academy) (2017)
 Top Model po-russki (Top Model) (2011-2012)

Karusel
 Poymy Menya (Kids edition) (Bruce Forsyth's Hot Streak)

U
 Караоке Киллер (Sing If You Can) (2013)
 Top Model po-russki (Top Model) (2012-2014)

Disney
 Ustami Mladenca (Child's Play) (2013-2014)

MTV Russia
 Проект Подиум - Project Runway Russia (Project Runway) (2011-2012)

TV6 (defunct)
 Obratnyy Otschot (The Vault) (2001)

Serbia
Da li ste pametniji od Đaka Petaka? (Serbian version of Are You Smarter Than a 5th Grader??)
Keš Taksi (Serbian version of Cash Cab)
Kviskoteka
Najslabija Karika (Serbian version of Weakest Link)
Put Oko Sveta
TV Slagalica
Uzmi ili Ostavi (Serbian version of Deal or No Deal)
Veliki Brat (Serbian/Montenegrin/Bosnian/Macedonian version of Big Brother)
Visoki Napon
Želite li da postanete milioner? (Serbian version of Who Wants to Be a Millionaire?)
Potera (Serbian version of The Chase)
Igraj za zavičaj

Slovakia 

 5 proti 5 (Slovak version of Family Feud)
 Milionár (Slovak version of Who Wants to Be a Millionaire?)
Taxík (Slovak original version of Cash Cab)
IQ Taxi (Slovak version of Cash Cab)
 Riskni milión (Slovak version of Holland Succes verzekerd)
 Pokušenie (Slovak original version of Jeopardy!)
 Riskuj! (Slovak version of Jeopardy!)
 Koleso šťastia (Slovak version of Wheel of Fortune)
 Ruku na to (Slovak original version of Deal or No Deal)
 Veľký balík (Slovak version of Deal or No Deal)
 Páli vám to? (Slovak version of Polish Daję słowo)
 Inkognito (Slovak version of What's My Line?)

Slovenia
Hipnoza: Dobra zabava (Slovenian version of You're Back in the Room) 
Kdo bi vedel (Slovenian version of Who Knew) 
Bitka parov (Slovenian version of Power Couple) 
Taksi, kviz z Jožetom (Slovenian version of Cash Cab)
Vem! (Slovenian version of Slam)
Vse je mogoće (Slovenian version of Riot)
Denar pada (Slovenian version of The Million Pound Drop Live)
Moj dragi zmore (Slovenian version of  Mein Man kann)
Moja Slovenija (Slovenian version of I Love My Country)
Minuta do zmage (Slovenian version of Minute to Win It)
Trenutek resnice (Slovenian version of The Moment of Truth)
Vse ali nič (Slovenian version of Divided)
Družinski dvoboj / Kdo bo koga (Slovenian version of Family Feud)
Vzemi ali pusti (Slovenian version of Deal or No Deal)
Najšibkejši člen (Slovenian version of Weakest Link)
Lepo je biti milionar / Milionar z Jonasom (Slovenian version of Who Wants to Be a Millionaire?)
1,2,3... kdo dobi?! (original format)
POP kviz (original format)
Kolo sreče (Slovenian version of Wheel of Fortune)

South Africa
Are You Smarter than a 5th Grader?
Deal or No Deal
Noot vir Noot (South Africa's longest running game show and named as one of the top 10 in the world)
 Telefun Quiz
Walk the Plank
 The Weakest Link
 Who Wants to Be a Millionaire?
A Word or 2 (South African version of Countdown)
Zama-Zama (1999 SABC 1 game show)

Spain
¡Ahora caigo! (Spanish version of Who's Still Standing?; 2011–2021)
¡Allá tú! (Spanish version of Deal or No Deal; 2004–2008, 2011)
Alta Tensión (Spanish version of Wipeout; 1998–1999, 2006–2008, 2011, 2021–)
Avanti, ¡que pase el siguiente! (Spanish version of Avanti un altro!; 2012)
Juego de niños (Spanish version of Child's Play; 1988–1992, 2019–present)
Decision Final (Spanish version of Russian Roulette; 2004)
El gran juego de la oca (The Big Goose Game; 1993–1995, 1998)
El Grand Prix del verano - (1995–2011) - (Spanish version of Intervilles)
Guaypaut (Spanish version of Wipeout; 2008–10)
Números Rojos (Red Numbers; 2005)
Pasapalabra (Spanish version of The Alphabet Game; 2000–present)
Password (Spanish version of Million Dollar Password; 2008–2010)
El Precio Justo (Spanish version of The Price Is Right; 1988–1993, 1996–1997; 1999–2002; 2006–2007; 2021–)
Cinquenta por quince: ¿Quiere ser millonario? (Who Wants to Be a Millionaire?; 1999–2001)
¿Quién quiere ser millonario? (Spanish version of Who Wants to Be a Millionaire?; 2005–2009, 2020–)
¿Quién quiere ser el millonario? (Millionaire Hot Seat; 2012)
El Rescate Del Talismán (Spanish version of Knightmare; 1991–1994)
El Rival Mas Debil (Spanish version of The Weakest Link; 2002–2004)
La Ruleta de la Suerte (Spanish version of Wheel of Fortune; 1990–1997, 2006–)
Saber y ganar (1997–)
¿Sabes más que un niño de primaria? (Spanish version of Are You Smarter Than a 5th Grader?; 2007–2008)
Los Segundos Cuentan (Spanish version of Every Second Counts; 1990–1991) 
Supermarket (Spanish version of Supermarket Sweep; 1992)
Te lo Mereces (Spanish version of You Deserve It; 2012)
Tres en Raya (Spanish version of Hollywood Squares)
Un, dos, tres... responda otra vez
VIP (programa de television) (Spanish version of Hollywood Squares)
Waku Waku
XO da dinero (Spanish version of Tic Tac Dough)

Sri Lanka
Gando Nogando
Punchi Pahe Mang

Thailand
 Ching Roi Ching Lan (ชิงร้อยชิงล้าน) (1990–present)
 Ching Roi Ching Lan (first version) (1990–1993)
 Ching Roi Ching Lan Top Secret (1993–1994)
 Ching Roi Ching Lan ONCE (1994–1995)
 Ching Roi Ching Lan Super Game (1996–1998)
 Ching Roi Ching Lan Cha Cha Cha (1998–2008, 2009–2011)
 Ching Roi Ching Lan 20th Century Tuck (2008–2009)
 Ching Roi Ching Lan Sunshine Day (2012–2015)
 Ching Roi Ching Lan Wow Wow Wow (2015–present)
 Deal or No Deal เอาหรือไม่เอา (Deal or No Deal Thailand) (2005)
 4 ต่อ 4 แฟมมิลี่เกม (Family Feud Thailand) (2001–2006, 2016–present)
 Game Zone (Magical Brain Power Thailand) (1996–2002)
 Iron Chef Thailand (2012–present)
 The Weakest Link กำจัดจุดอ่อน (The Weakest Link Thailand) (2002)
 เกมเศรษฐี (Who Wants to Be a Millionaire? Thailand) (2000–2008, 2019–2020)
 1 vs 100 Thailand (2008)
 ถ้าคุณแน่? อย่าแพ้เด็ก(ประถม)! (Are You Smarter Than A 5th Grader? Thailand) (2007–2009)
 Fan Pan Tae (แฟนพันธุ์แท้) (2000–2008, 2012–2017, 2018)
 Lightning Quiz (ปริศนาฟ้าแลบ) (2014–2019)
 Still Standing Thailand (2015–2019)
 The Money Drop Thailand (2014–2018)

Turkey

ATV
 Kim Milyoner Olmak Ister (Who Wants to Be a Millionaire?)
 Piramit (Pyramid)
 En Zayıf Halka (Turkish version of The Weakest Link )  (2019)
 Kapanmadan Kazan (Raid the Cage) (2013)
 Güven bana (Trust) (2012)
 Sen Hak Ediyorsun (You Deserve It) (2011)
 Kelimenin Gücü (Million Dollar Password) (2010-2011)
 Dans Eder misin? Yaz Ateşi (So You Think You Can Dance) (2007-2011)
 Ünlüler Çiftliği (The Farm) (2004)
 Akademi Türkiye (Star Academy) (2004)
 Kaç Para? (The Price Is Right) (2003-2004, 2011)
 Trilyon Avi (Deal or No Deal) (2003-2004)
 Aslan Payi (Greed) (2000)
 Seç Bakalim (Let's Make a Deal) (1995-1998)
 Aşağı Yukarı (Card Sharks) (1994-1997)
 XOX: Kare Akademisi (Hollywood Squares) (1993-1996)

FOX
 Sıradaki Gelsin (Avanti un altro!)
 Fear Factor Aksiyon (Fear Factor) (2013)
 Var misin? Yok musun? (Deal or No Deal) (2011-2012)
 Bir Milyon Canli Para (The Million Pound Drop) (2012)
 101 (101 Ways to Leave a Gameshow) (2010)
 Mehmet Ali Erbil'le 50 Sarisin (Beat the Blondes) (2009)
 Kandiramazsin Beni (Hollywood Squares) (2009)
 Fort Boyard (Fort Boyard) (2008-2009)
 Dans Eder misin? (So You Think You Can Dance) (2006)

Kanal D
 Çarkifelek (Wheel of Fortune)
 Koltuk (The Chair) (2002)
 Takip (The Chase) (2014-2015)
 Bir Milyon Canli Para (The Million Pound Drop) (2014)
 X Factor: Star Işığı (2014)
 Kazanmak için 1 Dakika (Minute to Win It) (2012)
 Kup (The Cube) (2010)
 Süpermarket (Supermarket Sweep) (2009)
 Aşkın Gözü Kördür (Dating in the Dark) (2009)
 Dans Eder misin? (So You Think You Can Dance) (2005)
 Büyük Teklif (Deal or No Deal) (2006)
 Yarisma Maratonu (Gameshow Marathon) (2006)
 Çırak (The Apprentice) (2005)
 Her Şey Yolunda (The Simple Life) (2004)
 Kim 500 Milyar Ister? (Who Wants to Be a Millionaire?) (2000-2004)
 Ya Sandadir Ya Bunda (Match Game) (1999)
 Bir Sarki Söyle (Name That Tune) (1998-1999)
 Aileler Yarisiyor (Family Feud) (1998)
 Yüzyilin Indirimi (Sale of the Century) (1995-1997)
 Şansini Dene (Press Your Luck) (1994-1996)

Star TV
 Büyük Risk (Jeopardy!)
 Kimsin Sen? (Identity)
 Big Brother Türkiye (2015-2016)
 Ve Kazanan (The Winner Is) (2015)
 Vay Arkadas (L'eredità) (2014-2015)
 O Ses Çocuklar (The Voice Kids) (2014)
 Benzemez Kimse Sana (Your Face Sounds Familiar) (2012, 2015)
 O Ses Türkiye (The Voice) (2012-2014)
 Eyvah Düsüyorum (Who's Still Standing?) (2012-2013, 2014)
 Yetenek Sizsiniz Türkiye! (Got Talent) (2012-2013)
 Yeni Bir Hayat (The Biggest Loser) (2012)
 Star Akademi (Star Academy) (2011)
 Fear Factor Extreme (Fear Factor) (2009-2010)
 5'e Gidenden Akilli Misin? (Are You Smarter than a 5th Grader?) (2007)
 Bak Su Duvara (Brain Wall) (2009)
 Kim Bir Milyon Ister? (Who Wants to Be a Millionaire?) (2008-2009)
 Rus Ruleti (Russian Roulette) (2008)
 Proje Moda (Project Runway) (2007)
 Ünlüler Sirki (Celebrity Circus) (2007)
 Top Model Türkiye (Top Model) (2006)
 Passaparola (The Alphabet Game) (2005-2010)
 Hazine Adasi (Fort Boyard) (2000)
 Yüzyilin Indirimi (Sale of the Century) (1998)

Show TV
 Var misin? Yok musun? (Deal or No Deal) (2007-2010, 2013-2014)
 Bir milyon kimin (The People's Quiz) (2013)
 Ben Burdan Atlarım (Celebrity Splash!) (2013)
 Benzemez Kimse Sana (Your Face Sounds Familiar) (2013)
 O Ses Türkiye (The Voice) (2011-2012)
 Bir Milyon Canli Para (The Million Pound Drop) (2010-2011)
 Yok Böyle Dans (Dancing with the Stars) (2010-2011)
 MasterChef Türkiye (MasterChef) (2010)
 Yetenek Sizsiniz Türkiye! (Got Talent) (2009-2011)
 Korolar Çarpışıyor (Clash of the Choirs) (2009)
 Wipeout (Wipeout) (2008)
 Huysuz'la Dans Eder misin? (So You Think You Can Dance) (2007-2011)
 Şarkı Söylemek Lazım (Just the Two of Us) (2007-2008)
 Buzda Dans (Dancing on Ice) (2007)
 Güzel ve Dahi (Beauty and the Geek) (2007)
 Fear Factor Türkiye (Fear Factor) (2006)
 Kim 500 Bin Ister? (Who Wants to Be a Millionaire?) (2005-2007)
 Gelinim Olur musun (Momma's Boys) (2004)
 Türkstar (Idol) (2004)
 En zayif halka (The Weakest Link) (2001-2002)
 Kim 500 Milyar Ister? (Who Wants to Be a Millionaire?) (2000-2004)
 Süper Aile (Family Feud) (1992-1994)
 XOX: Kare Akademisi (Hollywood Squares) (1993-1996)
 Saklambaç (The Dating Game) (1992-1996)
 Haydi Bastır (Blockbusters) (1992-1993)
 (The Singing Bee)

TRT 1
 Bir Kelime, Bir İşlem (Countdown)
 Aileler Yarişiyor (Family Feud) (2013-2014)
 Bilir Bilmez (Going for Gold) (1996)
 Riziko! (Jeopardy!) (1994-1996)
 Türkiye Yarışıyor (The People Versus) (2003-2004)

TV8
 O Ses Türkiye (The Voice)
 O Ses Çocuklar (The Voice Kids)
 Yetenek Sizsiniz Türkiye! (Got Talent)
 Survivor: Ünlüler vs. Gönüllüler (Survivor)
 Rising Star Türkiye (Rising Star) (2015-2016)
 En zayif halka (The Weakest Link) (2015)
 Ninja Warrior Türkiye (Ninja Warrior) (2014)
 Ver Fırına (The Great British Bake Off) (2014)
 Aileler Yarisiyor (Family Feud) (2014)
 Yemekteyiz (Come Dine with Me) (2009)

Kanal 7
 Riziko! (Jeopardy!) (1994-2001)

TRT Çocuk
 Bilen Parmak Kaldırsın (Britain's Brainiest Kid) (2009)

NTV
 Mastermind Türkiye (Mastermind) (2013)

TNT (defunct) 

 Aklın Yolu Bir (What? Where? When?) (2011)

Turkmax (defunct)

 Anlaşma (Divided) (2010)

Kanal 1 (defunct)
 Süper Aile (2008)
 Star Akademi Türkiye (Star Academy) (2008)
 Passaparola (The Alphabet Game) (2006-2008)

Kanal 6 (defunct)
 Süpermarket (Supermarket Sweep) (1994)
 Seç Bakalım (Let's Make a Deal) (1992-1995)
 Parola (Password) (1992-1997)

Samanyoulu TV (defunct)
 Kelime Zinciri (Chain Reaction) (2012)

Cine5 (defunct)
 1'e Karşı 100 (1 vs. 100) (2007)

Ukraine
Chervone abo chorne? (Ukrainian version of Red or Black?)
Chy rozumnishyy ti za p'yatyklasnyka? (Ukrainian version of Are You Smarter than a 5th Grader?)
Detektor brekhni (Ukrainian version of Nada mas que la verdad)
Hrayesh chy ne hrayesh? (Ukrainian version of Deal or No Deal)
Intuitsiya (Ukrainian version of Identity)
Khto proty blondynok? (Ukrainian version of Beat the Blondes)
Khto khoche staty milyonerom? (second Ukrainian version of Who Wants to Be a Millionaire?)
Kub (Ukrainian version of The Cube)
Milyoner - Garyache Krislo (Ukrainian version of Millionaire Hot Seat)
Pershiy Milion (Ukrainian version of Who Wants to Be a Millionaire?)
Prosto Shou (Ukrainian version of Family Feud)
Shou Na Dva Milyoni (Ukrainian version of The Million Pound Drop Live)
Shou Shara (Ukrainian version of Supermarket Sweep)
Tilki pravda? (Ukrainian version of Nada mas que la verdad)

United Kingdom

United States

Venezuela
Contra reloj (2001–2002; Pyramid)
El Gran Navegante (2007–2008)
Guerra De Los Sexos (2000–2006)
Match 4 (1980s; Pyramid)
Mega Match (1996–2007)
El Poder de Ganar (2008; Power of 10)
¿Qué dice la gente? (Family Feud)

Vietnam

VTV 

1 không 2 (The Only)
5 vòng vàng kỳ ảo (5 Gold Rings)
72 giờ thách thức sức bền 
100 giây rực rỡ - All Together Now
Ai là ai (Who Is Who) (2006–2007)
Ai là bậc thầy chính hiệu (Who Is The Real Celebrity?)
Ai là triệu phú (Who Wants to Be a Millionaire? - Millionaire Hot Seat) (2005–now)
Ai thông minh hơn học sinh lớp 5? (Are You Smarter Than a 5th Grader?) (2012 – 2014)
Ai tỏa sáng (2016)
Ảo thuật siêu phàm – Amazing Magicians (2018)
Ánh sáng hay Bóng tối (Heaven Or Hell) (2017)
Bài hát đầu tiên (2020-now)
Bài hát hay nhất (Sing My Song)
Bật mí bí mật
Bản lĩnh nhóc tỳ
Ban nhạc Việt - The Band
Bạn có bình thường (Are You Normal) (2015-2016?)
Bàn thắng Vàng – Golden Goal
Biệt đội vui nhộn (G-Wars)
Bộ 3 siêu đẳng
Bố ơi! Mình đi đâu thế? - Dad! Where Are We Going? (2014-2018)
Bố ơi mẹ thích gì
Biệt tài tí hon – Little But Special
Bước nhảy hoàn vũ (Dancing with the Stars - VIP Dance) (2010-2016?)
Bước nhảy ngàn cân – Dance Your Fat Off
Ca sĩ ẩn danh - Shadows Singer 
Ca sĩ tranh tài (Singer Take It All)
Cặp đôi hoàn hảo (Just the Two of Us) (2012)
Cầu thủ tí hon - Shootdori (2011-2015)
Cầu thủ nhí (upgraded version of Cầu thủ tí hon, 2018-now, formerly broadcast on HTV7)
Cháu ơi cháu à (Generation Gap) (2017)
Chân ái (2020)
Chắp cánh thương hiệu (2007-2011)
Chết cười - Anything Goes (2015)
Chìa khóa thành công (2007-2009)
Chìa khóa vàng (BrainTeaser) (2007–2010)
Chiếc nón kỳ diệu (Wheel of Fortune) (2001–2016)
Chinh phục (Britain's Brainiest Kid)
Chọn đâu cho đúng (Crush) (2020)
Chọn ngay đi (The Best of All) (2020)
Chuẩn cơm mẹ nấu (My Mom Cooks Better Than Yours) (2015-now)
Chúng ta là 1 gia đình
Chúng tôi là chiến sĩ (2006-2019)
Chiến sĩ 2020 (upgraded version of Chúng tôi là chiến sĩ)
Chị em chúng mình - The Real (2020)
Con biết tuốt (Out of Control) (2016–2017)
Con số vui nhộn (Attention à la marche) (2007–2009)
Cơ hội cho ai - Whose Chance (2019-now)
Cố lên con yêu (Bet On Your Baby) (2016-2018)
Cùng hát lên nào (Sing On!)
Cuộc đua kỳ thú (The Amazing Race)
Đường lên đỉnh Olympia (Digital LG Quiz) (1999-now)
Đấu trường 100 (1 vs. 100) (2006–2015)
Đố ai hát được (Sing If You Can) (2013)
Đối mặt (La Cible) (2007–2010)
Đoán tuổi như ý - Guess My Age (2019)
Đấu trí (PokerFace) (2007–2008)
Đại chiến âm nhạc
Đại náo thành Takeshi (Takeshi's Castle) (2017)
Đại náo thư viện chiến (Silent Library) (2019–now)
Đừng để tiền rơi (The Million Pound Drop) (2014–2017)
Gà đẻ trứng vàng (2019–2020)
Giác quan thứ 6
Giai điệu chung đôi
Giai điệu bí ẩn - Karaoke Showdown (VTV9)
Giọng hát Việt (The Voice - The Voice Kids) (2012-2021)
Gương mặt thân quen (Your Face Sounds Familiar) (2013–now)
Hà Nội 36 phố phường (2009–2010)
Hành khách cuối cùng (The Last Passenger - O Último Passageiro) (2007–2009)
Hành lý tình yêu (Baggage) (2020-now)
Hành trình văn hóa (2001–2007)
Hãy chọn giá đúng (The Price Is Right) (2004-now)
Hãy xem tôi diễn
Hãy yêu nhau đi
Hẹn ngay đi (The Choice)
Hóa đơn may mắn
Hoán đổi - Switched
Hợp ca tranh tài (Clash Of The Choirs) (2012)
Kèo này ai thắng (2020)
Khám phá chữ Việt (BrainTeaser) (2008–2010)
Khắc nhập khắc xuất (Show Me the Money) (2008–2010)
Không giới hạn - Sasuke Vietnam (2015-2019)
Không thỏa hiệp (Divided) (2019)
Ký ức vui vẻ  (De Generatie Show) (2018–now)
Lạ lắm à nha - The Wall Song
Lựa chọn của trái tim - Sexy Boats
Làm giàu không khó (VTV1)
Mặt trời bé con (Little Big Shots) (2017)
Mẹ tuyệt vời nhất
Một bước để chiến thắng (Step Right Up) (2013-2014)
Một trăm triệu một phút (Million Dollar Minute) (2015–now)
Nhà thiết kế tương lai nhí
Nhập gia tùy tục
Ngôi sao Việt - VK Pop Super Star (2013)
Ngôi sao thiết kế Việt Nam
Người đi xuyên tường (Hole in the wall - Brain Wall)
Người đứng thẳng 
Người giấu mặt (Big Brother) (2014)
Người kế tiếp (The Next One) (2014)
Người một nhà
Người nông dân hiện đại
Nhà Đầu tư tài ba (Dollars and Sense) (2007–2008)
Nhân tố bí ẩn - The X Factor
Nhóm nhảy siêu Việt - Vietnam best Dance Crew
Ở nhà chủ nhật (1999–2007)
Ô chữ vàng (BrainTeaser) (2007–2009)
Ô cửa bí mật (Let's Make a Deal) (2008–2012)
Ô hay, gì thế này? - Trick of True
Ông bố hoàn hảo 
Ơn giời cậu đây rồi! (Thank God You Are Here) (2014–now)
Quả cầu bí ẩn (Boom!) (2019–now)
Quý ông đại chiến (Man O Man) (2018–now)
Quyền lực ghế nóng 
Rung chuông vàng (Challenge! The Golden Bell) (2006–2012)
Sàn chiến giọng hát - Singer Auction (2018-2021)
Sáng tạo Việt (2012-2018?)
Sao nhập ngũ
Sếp nhí khởi nghiệp – Kiddle Shark
Siêu đầu bếp (Iron Chef Vietnam) (2012-2013)
Siêu nhân mẹ - Super Mum
Siêu sao Ẩm thực (Crazy Market)
Sinh ra để tỏa sáng (Born To Shine)
Song đấu (Versus) (2016)
Sức nước ngàn năm (2018-now)
SV (1996 as SV96, 2000 as SV2000, 2012 as SV2012, 2016 as SV2016, 2020-2021 as SV2020)
Tài năng DJ
Tam sao thất bản (2006–2009)
Thương vụ bạc tỷ (Shark Tank) 
Tiền khéo tiền khôn
Tiếp lửa tài năng (based on Đường lên đỉnh Olympia, for the central area)
Tiếp sức (For the Rest of Your Life) (2008)
Trạng nguyên nhí 
Trẻ em luôn đúng - The Kids Are All Right (2011–2012; 2013–2015)
Trời sinh một cặp – It Takes 2
Thế giới Rap - King Of Rap - Show Me The Money (2020)
Thiếu niên nói - Teenager Said (2020)
Thử thách đường phố – Street Fight (2014?)
Thử thách nhân đôi (Double Dare) (2006–2007)
Thử thách trốn thoát - The Great Escape
Tôi yêu thể thao – A Question of Sport
Trí lực sánh đôi (Body and Brain) (2018?)
Trò chơi âm nhạc (The Lyrics Board/Don't Forget the Lyrics) (2002–2015)
Trò chơi liên tỉnh - Intervilles (1996–1997)
Tranh tài thể thao (2009-2010)
Tường lửa (The Wall) (2019-now)
Tỷ lệ may mắn 
Úm ba la ra chữ gì (2019-2020)
Vì bạn xứng đáng (You Deserve It) (2013–2021)
Vua tiếng Việt 
Vui - khỏe - có ích (2004–now)
Vui cùng bé yêu (VTV1)
Vũ điệu đam mê (Got To Dance) (2013)
Vượt thời gian (VTV9)
Vượt thành chiến (Block Out) (2019–2020)

HTV 

3-2-1 (2012-2013)
5 giây thành triệu phú
7 nụ cười xuân
1000 độ hot (2016)
AHA (2014-2015)
Ai dám hát (Sing If You Can) (2014)
Âm nhạc & tuổi trẻ (HTV's first ever game show)
Ẩm thực kỳ duyên
À đúng rồi
Ai cũng bật cười - Laugh Out Loud (2016-2018) 
Ai hiểu mẹ nhất? (2013-2014)
Ai nhanh hơn (2005-2007?)
ATM (2008–2009)
Bậc thầy ẩn danh
Bạn đường hợp ý
Bạn là ngôi sao - Be A Star (2017)
Bạn muốn hẹn hò (Punchi De Deto) (2013-now)
Bí kíp vàng (2020-now)
Bí mật đêm chủ nhật (Whose Line Is It Anyway?) (2015-2017)
Bí mật gia đình (Family Secrets) (2006–2008)
Biệt đội phấn trắng
Biệt đội lồng tiếng 
Biệt đội thông thái 
Bố con cùng vui (2012-2014, upgraded version of Tí hon tranh tài)
Ca sĩ bí ẩn (2017-now)
Cả nhà thương nhau (2020)
Cao thủ đấu nhạc (The Big Music Quiz)
Căn bếp vui nhộn 
Chinh phục thời gian (Conquer Time)
Cho phép được yêu
Chọn ai đây (Celebrity Squares/Hollywood Squares) (2020)
Chọn mặt gửi vàng - Smart Face (2015, 2016)
Chinh phục đỉnh Everest (2007-2008)
Chung sức (Family Feud) (2004–2016)
Chuyện nhỏ (Small Talk) (2005–2007; 2010–2014)
Chạy đi chờ chi (Running Man (game show))
Chúng tôi muốn biết - Are You Stylist 
Chúc mừng sinh nhật (2007?)
Cơ hội đến
Cơ hội đổi đời  
Cuộc đua kỳ thú - The Amazing Race
Cười là thua - Laugh And You Lose (2014-2015)
Đánh thức giai điệu (2010-2012)
Đàn ông phải thế - My Man Can (2015-2017)
Đại chiến âm nhạc
Đại chiến kén rể (2018)
Đại chiến tứ sắc (Panel Quiz Attack 25) (2019)
Đầu bếp đỉnh - Top Chef (2015)
Đầu bếp thượng đỉnh - Top Chef
Đấu trường 9+
Đấu trường đường phố 
Đấu trường tiếu lâm - Funny Warriors (2016)
Đấu trường võ nhạc
Đèn xanh đèn đỏ
Đi sao cho đúng (2012-2013)
Đi tìm ẩn số (Deal or No Deal) (aired as a part of Tạp chí văn nghệ) (2005–2017)
Điểm số hoàn hảo (Perfect Score) (2014-2015)
Điệp vụ đối đầu
Đọ sức âm nhạc (The Fever) (2012-2014)
Đối mặt thời gian (Face the Clock) (2019-now)
Đối mặt cảm xúc
Đúng là 1 đôi
Đưa em về nhà (Drive Me Home) (2019–2020)
Đùa như thật - Thật như đùa
Gia đình tài tử (2010–2017)
Gia đình thông thái (Family Game Night)
Giọng ải giọng ai (I Can See Your Voice) (2016-now)
Giọng ca bất bại (2018)
Giải mã cặp đôi (2014-2015)
Giải mã cơ thể - Inche Tamheomdae (Explorers Of The Human Body) (2016)
Giải mã đàn ông
Giọng ca bí ẩn (2019)
Gương mặt điện ảnh
Góc bếp thông minh
Hát câu chuyện tình
Hát cho ngày mai
Hát cùng mẹ yêu
Hát là vui - Vui là hát (2011-2012)
Hát mãi ước mơ (Sing My Dream)
Hát với ngôi sao (2005-2011)
Hàng xóm lắm chiêu - Noisy Neighbors (2015-2017)
Hội ngộ bất ngờ - Ciao Darwin (2007-2009)
Im lặng là vàng - The Noise
Kế hoạch gia đình hạnh phúc
Kim tự tháp (Pyramid) (2005–2008)
Khẩu vị ngôi sao
Khi mẹ vắng nhà
Khi chàng vào bếp (2018-2019)
Khuấy động nhịp đam mê (2008 - 2009) - Karaoke Kings and Queens (BBC England)
Khúc hát se duyên - Sing Date
Khuôn mặt đáng tin - Basic Instinct
Kỳ tài thách đấu (Ching Roi Ching Lan Wow Wow Wow) (2016-now)
Kỳ phùng địch thủ - Lip Sync Battle
Ký ức bất ngờ
Lựa chọn thông minh (outdoor version of Supermarket Sweep, but not a part of the franchise) 
Mảnh ghép tình yêu
Mãi mãi thanh xuân (2018-2019)
Mặt nạ ngôi sao - King Of Mask Singer
Mẹ chồng nàng dâu
Mẹ là nhất
Mong đợi 1 ngày vui
Một phút để chiến thắng (Minute to Win It) (2012)
Mọi người cùng thắng (Every One Win'$) (2005–2006)
Nào ta cùng hát (2007-2009)
Ngôi sao tình yêu (The Love Machine) 
Ngôi nhà âm nhạc - Star Academy (Operación Triunfo)
Ngôi nhà mơ ước (2006-2015)
Ngạc nhiên chưa (similar to Password but not a part of the franchise, 2015–2020)
Năng động (2005)
Nghệ sĩ thử tài P336
Người ấy là ai - Who Is Single (2018-2020)
Người bán háng số 1
Người bí ẩn (Odd One In) (2014-2019)
Người chiến thắng 
Người đứng vững (Who's Still Standing)
Người đi xuyên tường nhí (Hole In The Wall, kids version)
Người hùng tí hon - Pequeños Gigantes (Little Giants)
Người kế tiếp - Next One (2014-2015)
Nhanh như chớp (Lightning Quiz) (2018–now)
Nhanh như chớp nhí - Fah Lab Dek (2018-now) 
Nhạc hội quê hương
Nhạc hội song ca - Duet Song Festival (2016-2018)
Nhóc nhà mình
Nốt nhạc vui (Name That Tune) (2004–2009)
Nốt nhạc ngôi sao (2009-2010)
Những em bé thông minh
P336
Phái mạnh Việt
Phản ứng bất ngờ
Phiên bản hoàn hảo - Cover Star
Phiên tòa tình yêu - Love Judge
Quà tặng bất ngờ 
Quà tặng tri thức (2007)
Quyền năng số 10 (The Power of 10) (2008–2010)
Quý ông hoàn hảo - Mister Perfect
RAP Việt - The Rapper (2020-now)
Rock Việt
Rồng vàng (unlicensed version of Who Wants to Be a Millionaire?, 2003–2007)
Sao hỏa sao kim (2020-now)
Sàn đấu ca từ (2017-2020)
Sàn đấu thời gian (The Money Pump) (2015–2017)
Siêu quậy tí hon (2008-2009)
Siêu sao đoán chữ (Match Game) (2017)
Sao hay chữ (2019-2020)
Siêu tài năng nhí - Super 10 (2020-now)
Siêu thị may mắn (Supermarket Sweep) (2005–2012)
Siêu nhí đấu trí
Siêu bất ngờ - Turn Back (2016-2021)
Siêu sao đoán chữ (Match Game) (2017)
Siêu hài nhí - Little Big Gang (2016)
Siêu trí tuệ Việt Nam (The Brain) (2019 - 2021)
Stinky & Stomper (2006)
Sức sống thanh xuân
Sự thật - Thật sự - Lies Allowed
Taxi may mắn (Cash Cab) (2012) 
Tâm đầu ý hợp (similar to The Newlywed Game but not a part of the franchise, 2020)
Tần số tình yêu
Thần tượng bóng rổ
Thần tượng tương lai
Thách là chơi
Thách thức danh hài (Crack Them Up) (2015-now)
Thiên đường ẩm thực - The King Of Food (2015-now)
Thế giới vui nhộn (Super Trio) (2006–2008)
Thử thách (2006–2008)
Thử tài thách trí (Clueless (game show)) (2011–2016)
Thử thách 99 giây cùng Quyền Linh
Thử thách cùng bước nhảy - So You Think You Can Dance (2012-2016)
Thử thách lớn khôn
Tí hon tranh tài (2011, upgraded version of Siêu quậy tí hon)
Tìm người bí ẩn (Dirty Rotten Cheater) (2006–2007)
Tìm người thông minh (Brainiest Kid) (2008)
Tiếng cười sinh viên
Tình yêu hoàn mỹ - Perfect Dating (2019-now, later rebranded as Tỏ tình hoàn mỹ)
Tôi có thể - I Can Do That
Tôi là người chiến thắng - The Winner Is... (2013-2015)
Tôi là người dẫn đầu (2012)
 Tôi tuổi Teen (2019)
Tuyệt chiêu siêu diễn - Lip Sync Ultimate (2016)
Tuyệt đỉnh tranh tài - Stjernekamp (The Ultimate Entertainer) (2014-2015)
Trúc xanh (similar to Concentration but not a part of the franchise, 2003–2007)
Trí khôn ta đây
Trăng mật diệu kỳ
Và tôi vẫn hát 
Vận động trường (1999-2000)
Việc làm
Về nhà đi anh
Về trường (Let's Go To School) (2012-2014)
Vì yêu mà đến - Perfect Dating (2017-2018)
Vui cùng Hugo
Vô lăng tình yêu 
Vợ chồng son (2015-now)
Vua phạt đền - Kick Hero (2017)
Vui ca đoán giọng
Vui để học (similar to Jeopardy! but not a part of the franchise, 2001–2007)
Vũ điệu tuổi xanh - Baby Ballroom
Vũ điệu vàng
Vui cùng con cháu
Vui cùng Hugo - Hugo
Vừa đi vừa hát
Vượt lên chính mình (based on a Thailand gameshow named ปลดหนี้) (2005–2019)
Vừng ơi mở cửa/Đào thoát - Raid The Cage (2016-2018)
Xin chào bác tài (aired as a part of Tạp chí văn nghệ)

THVL 
 
Ai đúng, ai sai? 
Cùng vượt lên chính mình (later rebranded Vượt qua thử thách) (loosely based on Vượt lên chính mình) (2012–2016)
Ca sĩ giấu mặt (Hidden Singer) (2015-2017)
Người hùng tí hon
Chuyến xe nhân ái 
Ban nhạc quyền năng
Chơi phải thắng 
Kỳ tài tranh đấu 
Bản lĩnh ngôi sao
Hát vui - Vui hát
Truy tìm cao thủ
Thứ 5 vui nhộn 
Ký ức ngọt ngào 
Người hùng tí hon - Pequeños Gigantes (Little Giants) 
Bức tường bí ẩn - Wall Of Fame (2015)
Đấu trường âm nhạc - Singing Battle 
Đấu trường âm nhạc nhí - Singing Battle
Lò võ tiếu lâm
Ca sĩ thần tượng
Truy tìm siêu bếp
Thiên thần đi học
Tuyệt đỉnh giác quan (2015)
Cùng nhau hái lộc (2020)
Vợ tôi là số 1 (2010-now)
Vui cười - Cười vui (a game show starring Cười xuyên Việt contestants, 2018)
Người hát tính ca
Sao là sao
Thần tài gõ cửa (2010-now) 
Đấu trường tiếu lâm
Cặp đôi hài hước 
Ẩn số hoàn hảo
Siêu thủ lĩnh
Đấu trường ngôi sao
Chinh phục thần tượng 
Bí ẩn song sinh 
Cả nhà cùng vui

BTV (Binh Duong) 
Details: List of television programmes broadcast by Binh Duong TV

Việt Nam quê hương tôi (2000s)
Công dân @
Vượt qua thử thách (Not related to the HanoiTV or THVL version at all)

VTC 
Details: List of television programmes broadcast by VTC
Trò chơi truyền hình xuyên quốc gia (The Biggest Game Show In The World (Asia)) (2011)
Cùng là tỷ phú
Thần đồng đất Việt (2016)
Một phút tỏa sáng
Bệ phóng tài năng (2009?)
Hẹn hò bí mật
Hoàng tử bóng đá - Soccer Prince
Anh hùng tứ phương 
Cứ nói đi
Đồng đội 4 chân
Việt Nam biển bạc
Chiếc cân may mắn (Perfect Balance!) (2013–2014)
Cơm ngon Con khỏe
1+1=1
Bé làm người lớn
Hát hay - hay hát

HanoiTV 

Khỏe và khéo (2000s) 
Cơ hội chiến thắng (2000s)
Cơ hội 999
Nào, hãy mời tôi vào nhà
Vui cùng nghệ sĩ (formerly known as Khắc họa chân dung) (2003–2006)
Hộp đen (Black Box) (2007–2009)
Mã số bí mật (possibly a Northern version of ATM) (before 2009)
Vượt qua thử thách (The Vault) (2004–2009)
Những ẩn số vàng (Deal or No Deal) (2006–2009)
Chơi chữ - BrainTeaser (2009 - 2012)
Vitamin (before 2011)
Đuổi hình bắt chữ (Catchphrase) (2004 - 2019; 2020 (upcoming))
Ai trúng số độc đắc (Have you got the balls?) (2013 - 2015)
Rồng bay (a game show commemorating 1000th anniversary of Hanoi, 2010)

THP (Hai Phong) 
Con đường chinh phục
Con tàu may mắn
Âm vang sông Hồng
Siêu thị sao (possibly a Northern version of Siêu thị may mắn)
Sắc màu hoa phượng

ĐNRTV (Dong Nai) 
Cầu vồng nghệ thuật
Nhanh tay lẹ mắt
Việt Nam quê hương tôi
Mũi tên vàng

HGTV (Ha Giang TV) 
Sống vui sống khỏe (losely based on Vui - khỏe - có ích)

KG (Kien Giang TV) 
Về Tây Nam (2009)

THTG (Tien Giang TV) 
Nhà nông tài ba
Đường đến vinh quang (based on Đường lên đỉnh Olympia) (2009–now)

TTV (Thanh Hoa TV) 
Âm vang xứ Thanh (based on Đường lên đỉnh Olympia) (2002–2009; 2018–now)
Nhà nông tài giỏi

TTV (Tuyen Quang TV) 
Chắp cánh ước mơ

THD (Hai Duong TV) 
Hành trình tri thức (based on Đường lên đỉnh Olympia)

QRT (Quang Nam TV) 
Học trò xứ Quảng (based on Đường lên đỉnh Olympia)

THĐT (Dong Thap TV) 
Tài tử miệt vườn
Đường đua bồ lúa (2020 - now)

TN (Thai Nguyen TV) 
Thắp sáng ước mơ

BRT (Ba Ria - Vung Tau TV) 
Nốt nhạc tuổi thơ
Cây cọ vàng
Chung sức tranh tài

STV (Soc Trang TV) 
Anvil về làng/Syngenta về làng
Mỹ nhân hành động
Khám phá tri thức (based on Đường lên đỉnh Olympia)
Nhà nông vượt khó
Đấu giá may mắn

THTPCT (Can Tho TV) 
Nhà nông tài ba
Lướt sóng

QRTV (Quang Tri TV) 
Chinh phục (based on Đường lên đỉnh Olympia, not to be confused with the VTV and HTV version which is a part of the Brainiest franchise)
Vui cùng nhà nông

STV (Son La TV) 
Về bản em
Sống vui - Sống khỏe

Da Nang TV 
Alo - Phú quý đến rồi (loosely based on Vượt lên chính mình)

BTV (Bac Ninh TV) 
Đất học Kinh Bắc (based on Đường lên đỉnh Olympia)

BGTV (Bac Giang TV) 
Bắc Giang: Hành trình lịch sử (based on Đường lên đỉnh Olympia)

NTV (Ninh Thuan TV) 
Những mốc son lịch sử (based on Đường lên đỉnh Olympia)
Cùng khám phá

NTV (Ninh Binh TV) 
Âm nhạc và những người bạn (losely based on first format of Trò chơi âm nhạc)

NTV (Nghe An TV) 
English Challenge (similar to Đường lên đỉnh Olympia but mainly in English)
Quê mình xứ Nghệ
Ông bà mẫu mực - Con cháu thảo hiền
Tuổi thần tiên

THLC (Lao Cai TV) 
Thử thách tiếng Anh  (English Challenge)
Biệt tài tí hon
Tôi tự tin
Còn mãi thanh xuân (losely based on Vui - khỏe - có ích)

SCTV (Vietnam Television) 
Tôi dám hát - Sing If You Can
Tôi là ai

See also
 Game show
 List of American game shows
 List of Australian game shows
 List of British game shows
 Reality television

References

International